

372001–372100 

|-bgcolor=#E9E9E9
| 372001 ||  || — || April 27, 2008 || Kitt Peak || Spacewatch || — || align=right | 2.3 km || 
|-id=002 bgcolor=#E9E9E9
| 372002 ||  || — || February 12, 2008 || Mount Lemmon || Mount Lemmon Survey || — || align=right | 1.0 km || 
|-id=003 bgcolor=#E9E9E9
| 372003 ||  || — || March 28, 2008 || Mount Lemmon || Mount Lemmon Survey || — || align=right | 1.1 km || 
|-id=004 bgcolor=#E9E9E9
| 372004 ||  || — || March 5, 2008 || Mount Lemmon || Mount Lemmon Survey || JUN || align=right | 1.00 km || 
|-id=005 bgcolor=#fefefe
| 372005 ||  || — || January 30, 2008 || Mount Lemmon || Mount Lemmon Survey || — || align=right data-sort-value="0.92" | 920 m || 
|-id=006 bgcolor=#E9E9E9
| 372006 ||  || — || March 5, 2008 || Mount Lemmon || Mount Lemmon Survey || — || align=right | 1.4 km || 
|-id=007 bgcolor=#E9E9E9
| 372007 ||  || — || January 10, 2007 || Mount Lemmon || Mount Lemmon Survey || — || align=right data-sort-value="0.83" | 830 m || 
|-id=008 bgcolor=#E9E9E9
| 372008 ||  || — || April 16, 2008 || Mount Lemmon || Mount Lemmon Survey || — || align=right | 1.3 km || 
|-id=009 bgcolor=#E9E9E9
| 372009 ||  || — || May 14, 2008 || Kitt Peak || Spacewatch || POS || align=right | 2.7 km || 
|-id=010 bgcolor=#E9E9E9
| 372010 ||  || — || May 5, 2008 || Kitt Peak || Spacewatch || — || align=right | 1.8 km || 
|-id=011 bgcolor=#E9E9E9
| 372011 ||  || — || May 26, 2008 || Kitt Peak || Spacewatch || HNS || align=right | 1.5 km || 
|-id=012 bgcolor=#E9E9E9
| 372012 ||  || — || May 28, 2008 || Kitt Peak || Spacewatch || EUN || align=right | 1.4 km || 
|-id=013 bgcolor=#E9E9E9
| 372013 ||  || — || April 30, 2008 || Mount Lemmon || Mount Lemmon Survey || — || align=right | 1.4 km || 
|-id=014 bgcolor=#E9E9E9
| 372014 ||  || — || June 3, 2008 || Kitt Peak || Spacewatch || — || align=right | 1.2 km || 
|-id=015 bgcolor=#E9E9E9
| 372015 ||  || — || June 4, 2008 || Kitt Peak || Spacewatch || EUN || align=right data-sort-value="0.95" | 950 m || 
|-id=016 bgcolor=#E9E9E9
| 372016 ||  || — || May 28, 2008 || Mount Lemmon || Mount Lemmon Survey || — || align=right | 1.4 km || 
|-id=017 bgcolor=#E9E9E9
| 372017 ||  || — || June 10, 2008 || Kitt Peak || Spacewatch || ADE || align=right | 2.3 km || 
|-id=018 bgcolor=#d6d6d6
| 372018 ||  || — || June 2, 2008 || Mount Lemmon || Mount Lemmon Survey || — || align=right | 6.3 km || 
|-id=019 bgcolor=#E9E9E9
| 372019 ||  || — || July 12, 2008 || La Sagra || OAM Obs. || AEO || align=right | 1.1 km || 
|-id=020 bgcolor=#E9E9E9
| 372020 ||  || — || July 25, 2008 || La Sagra || OAM Obs. || — || align=right | 2.9 km || 
|-id=021 bgcolor=#E9E9E9
| 372021 ||  || — || July 26, 2008 || Siding Spring || SSS || — || align=right | 2.9 km || 
|-id=022 bgcolor=#d6d6d6
| 372022 ||  || — || August 7, 2008 || Kitt Peak || Spacewatch || KOR || align=right | 1.5 km || 
|-id=023 bgcolor=#E9E9E9
| 372023 ||  || — || August 6, 2008 || Siding Spring || SSS || — || align=right | 3.7 km || 
|-id=024 bgcolor=#d6d6d6
| 372024 Ayapani ||  ||  || August 24, 2008 || Ishigakijima || Ishigakijima Obs. || — || align=right | 2.8 km || 
|-id=025 bgcolor=#E9E9E9
| 372025 ||  || — || August 25, 2008 || La Sagra || OAM Obs. || — || align=right | 3.3 km || 
|-id=026 bgcolor=#E9E9E9
| 372026 ||  || — || August 20, 2008 || Tiki || N. Teamo || — || align=right | 3.0 km || 
|-id=027 bgcolor=#d6d6d6
| 372027 ||  || — || August 21, 2008 || Kitt Peak || Spacewatch || — || align=right | 2.3 km || 
|-id=028 bgcolor=#d6d6d6
| 372028 ||  || — || August 21, 2008 || Kitt Peak || Spacewatch || KOR || align=right | 1.4 km || 
|-id=029 bgcolor=#d6d6d6
| 372029 ||  || — || August 24, 2008 || Kitt Peak || Spacewatch || EOS || align=right | 2.4 km || 
|-id=030 bgcolor=#d6d6d6
| 372030 ||  || — || September 3, 2008 || Kitt Peak || Spacewatch || — || align=right | 2.6 km || 
|-id=031 bgcolor=#d6d6d6
| 372031 ||  || — || September 4, 2008 || Kitt Peak || Spacewatch || — || align=right | 1.9 km || 
|-id=032 bgcolor=#E9E9E9
| 372032 ||  || — || August 24, 2008 || Kitt Peak || Spacewatch || WIT || align=right | 1.2 km || 
|-id=033 bgcolor=#d6d6d6
| 372033 ||  || — || September 4, 2008 || Kitt Peak || Spacewatch || — || align=right | 3.0 km || 
|-id=034 bgcolor=#E9E9E9
| 372034 ||  || — || September 5, 2008 || Pla D'Arguines || R. Ferrando || — || align=right | 2.6 km || 
|-id=035 bgcolor=#d6d6d6
| 372035 ||  || — || September 2, 2008 || Kitt Peak || Spacewatch || — || align=right | 3.0 km || 
|-id=036 bgcolor=#d6d6d6
| 372036 ||  || — || September 2, 2008 || Kitt Peak || Spacewatch || — || align=right | 2.5 km || 
|-id=037 bgcolor=#d6d6d6
| 372037 ||  || — || September 2, 2008 || Kitt Peak || Spacewatch || — || align=right | 3.4 km || 
|-id=038 bgcolor=#d6d6d6
| 372038 ||  || — || September 2, 2008 || Kitt Peak || Spacewatch || — || align=right | 2.5 km || 
|-id=039 bgcolor=#d6d6d6
| 372039 ||  || — || September 2, 2008 || Kitt Peak || Spacewatch || K-2 || align=right | 2.0 km || 
|-id=040 bgcolor=#d6d6d6
| 372040 ||  || — || September 2, 2008 || Kitt Peak || Spacewatch || — || align=right | 3.1 km || 
|-id=041 bgcolor=#d6d6d6
| 372041 ||  || — || September 4, 2008 || Kitt Peak || Spacewatch || — || align=right | 2.8 km || 
|-id=042 bgcolor=#d6d6d6
| 372042 ||  || — || September 4, 2008 || Kitt Peak || Spacewatch || — || align=right | 2.3 km || 
|-id=043 bgcolor=#d6d6d6
| 372043 ||  || — || September 6, 2008 || Catalina || CSS || — || align=right | 2.7 km || 
|-id=044 bgcolor=#d6d6d6
| 372044 ||  || — || September 7, 2008 || Mount Lemmon || Mount Lemmon Survey || — || align=right | 2.4 km || 
|-id=045 bgcolor=#d6d6d6
| 372045 ||  || — || September 3, 2008 || Kitt Peak || Spacewatch || — || align=right | 2.8 km || 
|-id=046 bgcolor=#d6d6d6
| 372046 ||  || — || September 5, 2008 || Kitt Peak || Spacewatch || — || align=right | 2.8 km || 
|-id=047 bgcolor=#d6d6d6
| 372047 ||  || — || September 5, 2008 || Kitt Peak || Spacewatch || — || align=right | 3.5 km || 
|-id=048 bgcolor=#d6d6d6
| 372048 ||  || — || September 5, 2008 || Kitt Peak || Spacewatch || — || align=right | 2.4 km || 
|-id=049 bgcolor=#d6d6d6
| 372049 ||  || — || September 6, 2008 || Kitt Peak || Spacewatch || — || align=right | 2.7 km || 
|-id=050 bgcolor=#d6d6d6
| 372050 ||  || — || September 7, 2008 || Mount Lemmon || Mount Lemmon Survey || HYG || align=right | 2.5 km || 
|-id=051 bgcolor=#d6d6d6
| 372051 ||  || — || September 7, 2008 || Mount Lemmon || Mount Lemmon Survey || — || align=right | 4.2 km || 
|-id=052 bgcolor=#d6d6d6
| 372052 ||  || — || September 7, 2008 || Mount Lemmon || Mount Lemmon Survey || — || align=right | 2.3 km || 
|-id=053 bgcolor=#d6d6d6
| 372053 ||  || — || September 5, 2008 || Kitt Peak || Spacewatch || — || align=right | 3.1 km || 
|-id=054 bgcolor=#d6d6d6
| 372054 ||  || — || September 6, 2008 || Mount Lemmon || Mount Lemmon Survey || MEL || align=right | 6.2 km || 
|-id=055 bgcolor=#d6d6d6
| 372055 ||  || — || September 7, 2008 || Mount Lemmon || Mount Lemmon Survey || — || align=right | 2.5 km || 
|-id=056 bgcolor=#E9E9E9
| 372056 ||  || — || September 9, 2008 || Mount Lemmon || Mount Lemmon Survey || AGN || align=right | 1.3 km || 
|-id=057 bgcolor=#d6d6d6
| 372057 ||  || — || September 2, 2008 || Kitt Peak || Spacewatch || — || align=right | 2.3 km || 
|-id=058 bgcolor=#d6d6d6
| 372058 ||  || — || September 3, 2008 || Kitt Peak || Spacewatch || — || align=right | 2.3 km || 
|-id=059 bgcolor=#d6d6d6
| 372059 ||  || — || September 3, 2008 || Kitt Peak || Spacewatch || EOS || align=right | 2.0 km || 
|-id=060 bgcolor=#d6d6d6
| 372060 ||  || — || September 4, 2008 || Kitt Peak || Spacewatch || — || align=right | 3.0 km || 
|-id=061 bgcolor=#d6d6d6
| 372061 ||  || — || September 6, 2008 || Mount Lemmon || Mount Lemmon Survey || THM || align=right | 2.1 km || 
|-id=062 bgcolor=#d6d6d6
| 372062 ||  || — || September 6, 2008 || Kitt Peak || Spacewatch || — || align=right | 2.4 km || 
|-id=063 bgcolor=#d6d6d6
| 372063 ||  || — || September 6, 2008 || Kitt Peak || Spacewatch || EOS || align=right | 1.9 km || 
|-id=064 bgcolor=#d6d6d6
| 372064 ||  || — || September 7, 2008 || Mount Lemmon || Mount Lemmon Survey || — || align=right | 3.6 km || 
|-id=065 bgcolor=#d6d6d6
| 372065 ||  || — || September 7, 2008 || Mount Lemmon || Mount Lemmon Survey || — || align=right | 2.4 km || 
|-id=066 bgcolor=#d6d6d6
| 372066 ||  || — || September 5, 2008 || Kitt Peak || Spacewatch || — || align=right | 2.2 km || 
|-id=067 bgcolor=#d6d6d6
| 372067 ||  || — || September 4, 2008 || Socorro || LINEAR || — || align=right | 3.9 km || 
|-id=068 bgcolor=#d6d6d6
| 372068 ||  || — || August 7, 2008 || Kitt Peak || Spacewatch || — || align=right | 2.8 km || 
|-id=069 bgcolor=#d6d6d6
| 372069 ||  || — || September 2, 2008 || Kitt Peak || Spacewatch || EOS || align=right | 1.6 km || 
|-id=070 bgcolor=#fefefe
| 372070 ||  || — || September 20, 2008 || Kitt Peak || Spacewatch || H || align=right data-sort-value="0.79" | 790 m || 
|-id=071 bgcolor=#fefefe
| 372071 ||  || — || September 23, 2008 || Catalina || CSS || H || align=right data-sort-value="0.77" | 770 m || 
|-id=072 bgcolor=#d6d6d6
| 372072 ||  || — || September 22, 2008 || Calvin-Rehoboth || Calvin–Rehoboth Obs. || THM || align=right | 2.3 km || 
|-id=073 bgcolor=#d6d6d6
| 372073 ||  || — || September 23, 2008 || Catalina || CSS || — || align=right | 3.6 km || 
|-id=074 bgcolor=#d6d6d6
| 372074 ||  || — || September 19, 2008 || Kitt Peak || Spacewatch || KOR || align=right | 1.7 km || 
|-id=075 bgcolor=#d6d6d6
| 372075 ||  || — || September 19, 2008 || Kitt Peak || Spacewatch || KOR || align=right | 1.6 km || 
|-id=076 bgcolor=#fefefe
| 372076 ||  || — || September 19, 2008 || Kitt Peak || Spacewatch || H || align=right data-sort-value="0.54" | 540 m || 
|-id=077 bgcolor=#d6d6d6
| 372077 ||  || — || September 20, 2008 || Kitt Peak || Spacewatch || — || align=right | 5.3 km || 
|-id=078 bgcolor=#d6d6d6
| 372078 ||  || — || September 20, 2008 || Mount Lemmon || Mount Lemmon Survey || — || align=right | 2.3 km || 
|-id=079 bgcolor=#d6d6d6
| 372079 ||  || — || September 20, 2008 || Kitt Peak || Spacewatch || — || align=right | 3.8 km || 
|-id=080 bgcolor=#d6d6d6
| 372080 ||  || — || September 20, 2008 || Kitt Peak || Spacewatch || — || align=right | 4.7 km || 
|-id=081 bgcolor=#E9E9E9
| 372081 ||  || — || September 20, 2008 || Kitt Peak || Spacewatch || AGN || align=right | 1.4 km || 
|-id=082 bgcolor=#d6d6d6
| 372082 ||  || — || September 20, 2008 || Kitt Peak || Spacewatch || — || align=right | 2.5 km || 
|-id=083 bgcolor=#d6d6d6
| 372083 ||  || — || August 24, 2008 || Kitt Peak || Spacewatch || — || align=right | 3.0 km || 
|-id=084 bgcolor=#d6d6d6
| 372084 ||  || — || September 20, 2008 || Mount Lemmon || Mount Lemmon Survey || EOS || align=right | 1.8 km || 
|-id=085 bgcolor=#d6d6d6
| 372085 ||  || — || September 20, 2008 || Mount Lemmon || Mount Lemmon Survey || — || align=right | 2.4 km || 
|-id=086 bgcolor=#d6d6d6
| 372086 ||  || — || September 20, 2008 || Mount Lemmon || Mount Lemmon Survey || — || align=right | 2.7 km || 
|-id=087 bgcolor=#d6d6d6
| 372087 ||  || — || September 20, 2008 || Mount Lemmon || Mount Lemmon Survey || — || align=right | 2.8 km || 
|-id=088 bgcolor=#d6d6d6
| 372088 ||  || — || September 20, 2008 || Mount Lemmon || Mount Lemmon Survey || — || align=right | 4.0 km || 
|-id=089 bgcolor=#d6d6d6
| 372089 ||  || — || September 21, 2008 || Mount Lemmon || Mount Lemmon Survey || — || align=right | 3.7 km || 
|-id=090 bgcolor=#d6d6d6
| 372090 ||  || — || September 21, 2008 || Mount Lemmon || Mount Lemmon Survey || EOS || align=right | 4.7 km || 
|-id=091 bgcolor=#d6d6d6
| 372091 ||  || — || September 23, 2008 || Mount Lemmon || Mount Lemmon Survey || — || align=right | 2.2 km || 
|-id=092 bgcolor=#d6d6d6
| 372092 ||  || — || September 21, 2008 || Kitt Peak || Spacewatch || EOS || align=right | 2.7 km || 
|-id=093 bgcolor=#d6d6d6
| 372093 ||  || — || September 21, 2008 || Kitt Peak || Spacewatch || — || align=right | 3.3 km || 
|-id=094 bgcolor=#d6d6d6
| 372094 ||  || — || September 21, 2008 || Kitt Peak || Spacewatch || — || align=right | 2.7 km || 
|-id=095 bgcolor=#d6d6d6
| 372095 ||  || — || September 21, 2008 || Kitt Peak || Spacewatch || HYG || align=right | 2.8 km || 
|-id=096 bgcolor=#d6d6d6
| 372096 ||  || — || September 21, 2008 || Kitt Peak || Spacewatch || URS || align=right | 4.1 km || 
|-id=097 bgcolor=#d6d6d6
| 372097 ||  || — || September 21, 2008 || Kitt Peak || Spacewatch || EOS || align=right | 2.2 km || 
|-id=098 bgcolor=#d6d6d6
| 372098 ||  || — || September 21, 2008 || Kitt Peak || Spacewatch || ALA || align=right | 4.8 km || 
|-id=099 bgcolor=#d6d6d6
| 372099 ||  || — || September 21, 2008 || Mount Lemmon || Mount Lemmon Survey || — || align=right | 3.2 km || 
|-id=100 bgcolor=#d6d6d6
| 372100 ||  || — || September 21, 2008 || Kitt Peak || Spacewatch || VER || align=right | 2.7 km || 
|}

372101–372200 

|-bgcolor=#d6d6d6
| 372101 ||  || — || September 21, 2008 || Kitt Peak || Spacewatch || HYG || align=right | 2.7 km || 
|-id=102 bgcolor=#d6d6d6
| 372102 ||  || — || September 22, 2008 || Mount Lemmon || Mount Lemmon Survey || KOR || align=right | 1.4 km || 
|-id=103 bgcolor=#d6d6d6
| 372103 ||  || — || September 22, 2008 || Mount Lemmon || Mount Lemmon Survey || KOR || align=right | 1.4 km || 
|-id=104 bgcolor=#d6d6d6
| 372104 ||  || — || September 22, 2008 || Mount Lemmon || Mount Lemmon Survey || — || align=right | 2.5 km || 
|-id=105 bgcolor=#d6d6d6
| 372105 ||  || — || September 22, 2008 || Kitt Peak || Spacewatch || — || align=right | 4.3 km || 
|-id=106 bgcolor=#d6d6d6
| 372106 ||  || — || September 22, 2008 || Kitt Peak || Spacewatch || — || align=right | 2.9 km || 
|-id=107 bgcolor=#d6d6d6
| 372107 ||  || — || September 22, 2008 || Kitt Peak || Spacewatch || — || align=right | 2.9 km || 
|-id=108 bgcolor=#d6d6d6
| 372108 ||  || — || September 22, 2008 || Kitt Peak || Spacewatch || — || align=right | 2.6 km || 
|-id=109 bgcolor=#d6d6d6
| 372109 ||  || — || September 22, 2008 || Kitt Peak || Spacewatch || — || align=right | 2.8 km || 
|-id=110 bgcolor=#d6d6d6
| 372110 ||  || — || September 22, 2008 || Kitt Peak || Spacewatch || HYG || align=right | 3.0 km || 
|-id=111 bgcolor=#fefefe
| 372111 ||  || — || September 22, 2008 || Kitt Peak || Spacewatch || H || align=right data-sort-value="0.76" | 760 m || 
|-id=112 bgcolor=#d6d6d6
| 372112 ||  || — || September 22, 2008 || Kitt Peak || Spacewatch || — || align=right | 2.0 km || 
|-id=113 bgcolor=#d6d6d6
| 372113 ||  || — || September 23, 2008 || Kitt Peak || Spacewatch || EOS || align=right | 2.1 km || 
|-id=114 bgcolor=#d6d6d6
| 372114 ||  || — || September 23, 2008 || Kitt Peak || Spacewatch || — || align=right | 2.7 km || 
|-id=115 bgcolor=#d6d6d6
| 372115 ||  || — || September 24, 2008 || Mount Lemmon || Mount Lemmon Survey || THM || align=right | 2.1 km || 
|-id=116 bgcolor=#d6d6d6
| 372116 ||  || — || September 20, 2008 || Kitt Peak || Spacewatch || — || align=right | 3.4 km || 
|-id=117 bgcolor=#d6d6d6
| 372117 ||  || — || September 23, 2008 || Catalina || CSS || — || align=right | 3.7 km || 
|-id=118 bgcolor=#d6d6d6
| 372118 ||  || — || August 24, 2008 || Kitt Peak || Spacewatch || — || align=right | 2.6 km || 
|-id=119 bgcolor=#d6d6d6
| 372119 ||  || — || September 28, 2008 || Socorro || LINEAR || — || align=right | 5.9 km || 
|-id=120 bgcolor=#d6d6d6
| 372120 ||  || — || September 28, 2008 || Socorro || LINEAR || — || align=right | 3.6 km || 
|-id=121 bgcolor=#d6d6d6
| 372121 ||  || — || September 28, 2008 || Socorro || LINEAR || — || align=right | 3.2 km || 
|-id=122 bgcolor=#d6d6d6
| 372122 ||  || — || September 21, 2008 || Mount Lemmon || Mount Lemmon Survey || — || align=right | 2.2 km || 
|-id=123 bgcolor=#d6d6d6
| 372123 ||  || — || September 24, 2008 || Kitt Peak || Spacewatch || — || align=right | 2.8 km || 
|-id=124 bgcolor=#d6d6d6
| 372124 ||  || — || September 24, 2008 || Kitt Peak || Spacewatch || — || align=right | 3.6 km || 
|-id=125 bgcolor=#d6d6d6
| 372125 ||  || — || September 24, 2008 || Mount Lemmon || Mount Lemmon Survey || VER || align=right | 2.9 km || 
|-id=126 bgcolor=#d6d6d6
| 372126 ||  || — || September 25, 2008 || Kitt Peak || Spacewatch || TIR || align=right | 3.5 km || 
|-id=127 bgcolor=#d6d6d6
| 372127 ||  || — || September 25, 2008 || Kitt Peak || Spacewatch || — || align=right | 2.8 km || 
|-id=128 bgcolor=#d6d6d6
| 372128 ||  || — || September 25, 2008 || Kitt Peak || Spacewatch || — || align=right | 4.3 km || 
|-id=129 bgcolor=#d6d6d6
| 372129 ||  || — || September 25, 2008 || Kitt Peak || Spacewatch || — || align=right | 2.6 km || 
|-id=130 bgcolor=#d6d6d6
| 372130 ||  || — || September 26, 2008 || Kitt Peak || Spacewatch || EOS || align=right | 2.6 km || 
|-id=131 bgcolor=#d6d6d6
| 372131 ||  || — || September 30, 2008 || La Sagra || OAM Obs. || — || align=right | 2.9 km || 
|-id=132 bgcolor=#d6d6d6
| 372132 ||  || — || September 26, 2008 || Kitt Peak || Spacewatch || — || align=right | 2.8 km || 
|-id=133 bgcolor=#fefefe
| 372133 ||  || — || September 29, 2008 || Kitt Peak || Spacewatch || H || align=right data-sort-value="0.52" | 520 m || 
|-id=134 bgcolor=#d6d6d6
| 372134 ||  || — || September 29, 2008 || Mount Lemmon || Mount Lemmon Survey || — || align=right | 2.7 km || 
|-id=135 bgcolor=#d6d6d6
| 372135 ||  || — || September 29, 2008 || Kitt Peak || Spacewatch || — || align=right | 3.2 km || 
|-id=136 bgcolor=#d6d6d6
| 372136 ||  || — || September 4, 2008 || Kitt Peak || Spacewatch || — || align=right | 3.1 km || 
|-id=137 bgcolor=#d6d6d6
| 372137 ||  || — || September 29, 2008 || Kitt Peak || Spacewatch || — || align=right | 3.5 km || 
|-id=138 bgcolor=#d6d6d6
| 372138 ||  || — || September 24, 2008 || Kitt Peak || Spacewatch || THM || align=right | 2.8 km || 
|-id=139 bgcolor=#d6d6d6
| 372139 ||  || — || September 21, 2008 || Kitt Peak || Spacewatch || — || align=right | 2.7 km || 
|-id=140 bgcolor=#d6d6d6
| 372140 ||  || — || September 23, 2008 || Kitt Peak || Spacewatch || EOS || align=right | 1.7 km || 
|-id=141 bgcolor=#d6d6d6
| 372141 ||  || — || September 21, 2008 || Kitt Peak || Spacewatch || EOS || align=right | 2.0 km || 
|-id=142 bgcolor=#d6d6d6
| 372142 ||  || — || September 21, 2008 || Catalina || CSS || — || align=right | 2.7 km || 
|-id=143 bgcolor=#d6d6d6
| 372143 ||  || — || September 23, 2008 || Kitt Peak || Spacewatch || — || align=right | 4.0 km || 
|-id=144 bgcolor=#d6d6d6
| 372144 ||  || — || September 27, 2008 || Mount Lemmon || Mount Lemmon Survey || EOS || align=right | 2.3 km || 
|-id=145 bgcolor=#d6d6d6
| 372145 ||  || — || September 29, 2008 || Catalina || CSS || — || align=right | 3.9 km || 
|-id=146 bgcolor=#d6d6d6
| 372146 ||  || — || September 23, 2008 || Catalina || CSS || — || align=right | 4.0 km || 
|-id=147 bgcolor=#d6d6d6
| 372147 ||  || — || September 23, 2008 || Kitt Peak || Spacewatch || VER || align=right | 4.3 km || 
|-id=148 bgcolor=#d6d6d6
| 372148 ||  || — || September 29, 2008 || Mount Lemmon || Mount Lemmon Survey || — || align=right | 4.1 km || 
|-id=149 bgcolor=#d6d6d6
| 372149 ||  || — || September 19, 2008 || Kitt Peak || Spacewatch || — || align=right | 2.5 km || 
|-id=150 bgcolor=#d6d6d6
| 372150 ||  || — || September 19, 2008 || Kitt Peak || Spacewatch || EOS || align=right | 1.8 km || 
|-id=151 bgcolor=#d6d6d6
| 372151 ||  || — || September 23, 2008 || Kitt Peak || Spacewatch || — || align=right | 3.7 km || 
|-id=152 bgcolor=#d6d6d6
| 372152 ||  || — || September 24, 2008 || Kitt Peak || Spacewatch || — || align=right | 3.7 km || 
|-id=153 bgcolor=#d6d6d6
| 372153 ||  || — || September 25, 2008 || Kitt Peak || Spacewatch || HYG || align=right | 2.6 km || 
|-id=154 bgcolor=#fefefe
| 372154 ||  || — || September 30, 2008 || Catalina || CSS || H || align=right data-sort-value="0.56" | 560 m || 
|-id=155 bgcolor=#d6d6d6
| 372155 ||  || — || September 24, 2008 || Mount Lemmon || Mount Lemmon Survey || — || align=right | 3.7 km || 
|-id=156 bgcolor=#d6d6d6
| 372156 ||  || — || September 30, 2008 || Catalina || CSS || — || align=right | 5.2 km || 
|-id=157 bgcolor=#d6d6d6
| 372157 ||  || — || September 29, 2008 || Mount Lemmon || Mount Lemmon Survey || — || align=right | 4.0 km || 
|-id=158 bgcolor=#d6d6d6
| 372158 ||  || — || September 27, 2008 || Mount Lemmon || Mount Lemmon Survey || THM || align=right | 2.8 km || 
|-id=159 bgcolor=#d6d6d6
| 372159 ||  || — || September 29, 2008 || Mount Lemmon || Mount Lemmon Survey || — || align=right | 3.3 km || 
|-id=160 bgcolor=#d6d6d6
| 372160 ||  || — || September 4, 2008 || Kitt Peak || Spacewatch || — || align=right | 2.9 km || 
|-id=161 bgcolor=#d6d6d6
| 372161 ||  || — || October 3, 2008 || Sandlot || G. Hug || — || align=right | 3.6 km || 
|-id=162 bgcolor=#d6d6d6
| 372162 ||  || — || October 3, 2008 || La Sagra || OAM Obs. || — || align=right | 2.7 km || 
|-id=163 bgcolor=#d6d6d6
| 372163 ||  || — || October 6, 2008 || Junk Bond || D. Healy || — || align=right | 3.0 km || 
|-id=164 bgcolor=#d6d6d6
| 372164 ||  || — || October 1, 2008 || Mount Lemmon || Mount Lemmon Survey || — || align=right | 4.3 km || 
|-id=165 bgcolor=#d6d6d6
| 372165 ||  || — || October 1, 2008 || Mount Lemmon || Mount Lemmon Survey || — || align=right | 2.8 km || 
|-id=166 bgcolor=#d6d6d6
| 372166 ||  || — || October 1, 2008 || Mount Lemmon || Mount Lemmon Survey || — || align=right | 2.2 km || 
|-id=167 bgcolor=#d6d6d6
| 372167 ||  || — || October 2, 2008 || Catalina || CSS || EOS || align=right | 2.2 km || 
|-id=168 bgcolor=#d6d6d6
| 372168 ||  || — || October 1, 2008 || Kitt Peak || Spacewatch || — || align=right | 3.4 km || 
|-id=169 bgcolor=#d6d6d6
| 372169 ||  || — || October 1, 2008 || Catalina || CSS || — || align=right | 3.3 km || 
|-id=170 bgcolor=#d6d6d6
| 372170 ||  || — || October 1, 2008 || Mount Lemmon || Mount Lemmon Survey || — || align=right | 4.1 km || 
|-id=171 bgcolor=#d6d6d6
| 372171 ||  || — || October 1, 2008 || Kitt Peak || Spacewatch || — || align=right | 3.0 km || 
|-id=172 bgcolor=#d6d6d6
| 372172 ||  || — || October 2, 2008 || Kitt Peak || Spacewatch || — || align=right | 2.9 km || 
|-id=173 bgcolor=#d6d6d6
| 372173 ||  || — || February 6, 2006 || Kitt Peak || Spacewatch || — || align=right | 3.6 km || 
|-id=174 bgcolor=#d6d6d6
| 372174 ||  || — || October 2, 2008 || Kitt Peak || Spacewatch || HYG || align=right | 3.2 km || 
|-id=175 bgcolor=#d6d6d6
| 372175 ||  || — || September 9, 2008 || Mount Lemmon || Mount Lemmon Survey || HYG || align=right | 2.4 km || 
|-id=176 bgcolor=#d6d6d6
| 372176 ||  || — || October 2, 2008 || Kitt Peak || Spacewatch || THM || align=right | 1.9 km || 
|-id=177 bgcolor=#d6d6d6
| 372177 ||  || — || October 2, 2008 || Kitt Peak || Spacewatch || — || align=right | 2.6 km || 
|-id=178 bgcolor=#d6d6d6
| 372178 ||  || — || October 2, 2008 || Catalina || CSS || EOS || align=right | 2.9 km || 
|-id=179 bgcolor=#d6d6d6
| 372179 ||  || — || October 2, 2008 || Kitt Peak || Spacewatch || THM || align=right | 2.3 km || 
|-id=180 bgcolor=#d6d6d6
| 372180 ||  || — || October 2, 2008 || Kitt Peak || Spacewatch || — || align=right | 3.4 km || 
|-id=181 bgcolor=#d6d6d6
| 372181 ||  || — || October 2, 2008 || Kitt Peak || Spacewatch || — || align=right | 3.4 km || 
|-id=182 bgcolor=#d6d6d6
| 372182 ||  || — || October 2, 2008 || Mount Lemmon || Mount Lemmon Survey || — || align=right | 4.4 km || 
|-id=183 bgcolor=#d6d6d6
| 372183 ||  || — || October 2, 2008 || Mount Lemmon || Mount Lemmon Survey || — || align=right | 2.3 km || 
|-id=184 bgcolor=#d6d6d6
| 372184 ||  || — || October 3, 2008 || Kitt Peak || Spacewatch || — || align=right | 3.9 km || 
|-id=185 bgcolor=#d6d6d6
| 372185 ||  || — || October 3, 2008 || Mount Lemmon || Mount Lemmon Survey || KOR || align=right | 1.7 km || 
|-id=186 bgcolor=#d6d6d6
| 372186 ||  || — || October 3, 2008 || Mount Lemmon || Mount Lemmon Survey || — || align=right | 2.9 km || 
|-id=187 bgcolor=#d6d6d6
| 372187 ||  || — || October 3, 2008 || Mount Lemmon || Mount Lemmon Survey || — || align=right | 2.3 km || 
|-id=188 bgcolor=#d6d6d6
| 372188 ||  || — || October 3, 2008 || Kitt Peak || Spacewatch || — || align=right | 3.3 km || 
|-id=189 bgcolor=#d6d6d6
| 372189 ||  || — || October 3, 2008 || Kitt Peak || Spacewatch || — || align=right | 3.7 km || 
|-id=190 bgcolor=#d6d6d6
| 372190 ||  || — || October 6, 2008 || Kitt Peak || Spacewatch || — || align=right | 2.7 km || 
|-id=191 bgcolor=#d6d6d6
| 372191 ||  || — || October 6, 2008 || Kitt Peak || Spacewatch || — || align=right | 3.6 km || 
|-id=192 bgcolor=#d6d6d6
| 372192 ||  || — || October 6, 2008 || Kitt Peak || Spacewatch || EOS || align=right | 2.1 km || 
|-id=193 bgcolor=#d6d6d6
| 372193 ||  || — || October 6, 2008 || Mount Lemmon || Mount Lemmon Survey || — || align=right | 2.5 km || 
|-id=194 bgcolor=#d6d6d6
| 372194 ||  || — || October 6, 2008 || Catalina || CSS || EOS || align=right | 2.3 km || 
|-id=195 bgcolor=#d6d6d6
| 372195 ||  || — || October 8, 2008 || Mount Lemmon || Mount Lemmon Survey || — || align=right | 3.2 km || 
|-id=196 bgcolor=#d6d6d6
| 372196 ||  || — || October 8, 2008 || Mount Lemmon || Mount Lemmon Survey || — || align=right | 2.6 km || 
|-id=197 bgcolor=#d6d6d6
| 372197 ||  || — || October 8, 2008 || Mount Lemmon || Mount Lemmon Survey || — || align=right | 4.3 km || 
|-id=198 bgcolor=#d6d6d6
| 372198 ||  || — || September 23, 2008 || Kitt Peak || Spacewatch || — || align=right | 2.8 km || 
|-id=199 bgcolor=#d6d6d6
| 372199 ||  || — || September 10, 2008 || Kitt Peak || Spacewatch || — || align=right | 2.5 km || 
|-id=200 bgcolor=#d6d6d6
| 372200 ||  || — || October 9, 2008 || Mount Lemmon || Mount Lemmon Survey || — || align=right | 2.7 km || 
|}

372201–372300 

|-bgcolor=#d6d6d6
| 372201 ||  || — || October 9, 2008 || Mount Lemmon || Mount Lemmon Survey || — || align=right | 3.4 km || 
|-id=202 bgcolor=#d6d6d6
| 372202 ||  || — || October 9, 2008 || Mount Lemmon || Mount Lemmon Survey || — || align=right | 2.5 km || 
|-id=203 bgcolor=#d6d6d6
| 372203 ||  || — || October 9, 2008 || Mount Lemmon || Mount Lemmon Survey || — || align=right | 2.1 km || 
|-id=204 bgcolor=#d6d6d6
| 372204 ||  || — || September 3, 2008 || Kitt Peak || Spacewatch || — || align=right | 3.1 km || 
|-id=205 bgcolor=#d6d6d6
| 372205 ||  || — || October 9, 2008 || Mount Lemmon || Mount Lemmon Survey || TEL || align=right | 1.9 km || 
|-id=206 bgcolor=#d6d6d6
| 372206 ||  || — || October 5, 2008 || La Sagra || OAM Obs. || EOS || align=right | 2.8 km || 
|-id=207 bgcolor=#d6d6d6
| 372207 ||  || — || October 2, 2008 || Kitt Peak || Spacewatch || THM || align=right | 2.6 km || 
|-id=208 bgcolor=#d6d6d6
| 372208 ||  || — || October 1, 2008 || Catalina || CSS || TIR || align=right | 3.4 km || 
|-id=209 bgcolor=#d6d6d6
| 372209 ||  || — || October 7, 2008 || Kitt Peak || Spacewatch || — || align=right | 2.6 km || 
|-id=210 bgcolor=#d6d6d6
| 372210 ||  || — || October 8, 2008 || Catalina || CSS || — || align=right | 2.9 km || 
|-id=211 bgcolor=#d6d6d6
| 372211 ||  || — || October 1, 2008 || Catalina || CSS || — || align=right | 3.4 km || 
|-id=212 bgcolor=#d6d6d6
| 372212 ||  || — || October 2, 2008 || Catalina || CSS || EOS || align=right | 2.4 km || 
|-id=213 bgcolor=#d6d6d6
| 372213 ||  || — || October 10, 2008 || Socorro || LINEAR || EUP || align=right | 7.9 km || 
|-id=214 bgcolor=#d6d6d6
| 372214 ||  || — || October 23, 2008 || Desert Moon || B. L. Stevens || — || align=right | 3.7 km || 
|-id=215 bgcolor=#d6d6d6
| 372215 ||  || — || October 17, 2008 || Kitt Peak || Spacewatch || — || align=right | 3.4 km || 
|-id=216 bgcolor=#d6d6d6
| 372216 ||  || — || October 17, 2008 || Kitt Peak || Spacewatch || — || align=right | 2.6 km || 
|-id=217 bgcolor=#d6d6d6
| 372217 ||  || — || September 2, 2008 || Kitt Peak || Spacewatch || — || align=right | 2.3 km || 
|-id=218 bgcolor=#d6d6d6
| 372218 ||  || — || October 19, 2008 || Kitt Peak || Spacewatch || — || align=right | 2.1 km || 
|-id=219 bgcolor=#d6d6d6
| 372219 ||  || — || October 20, 2008 || Kitt Peak || Spacewatch || — || align=right | 4.8 km || 
|-id=220 bgcolor=#d6d6d6
| 372220 ||  || — || October 20, 2008 || Kitt Peak || Spacewatch || — || align=right | 4.1 km || 
|-id=221 bgcolor=#d6d6d6
| 372221 ||  || — || October 20, 2008 || Mount Lemmon || Mount Lemmon Survey || — || align=right | 2.6 km || 
|-id=222 bgcolor=#d6d6d6
| 372222 ||  || — || October 20, 2008 || Kitt Peak || Spacewatch || — || align=right | 3.4 km || 
|-id=223 bgcolor=#d6d6d6
| 372223 ||  || — || October 20, 2008 || Kitt Peak || Spacewatch || — || align=right | 3.4 km || 
|-id=224 bgcolor=#d6d6d6
| 372224 ||  || — || September 25, 2008 || Kitt Peak || Spacewatch || THM || align=right | 2.9 km || 
|-id=225 bgcolor=#d6d6d6
| 372225 ||  || — || October 21, 2008 || Kitt Peak || Spacewatch || — || align=right | 2.5 km || 
|-id=226 bgcolor=#d6d6d6
| 372226 ||  || — || October 21, 2008 || Kitt Peak || Spacewatch || — || align=right | 3.6 km || 
|-id=227 bgcolor=#d6d6d6
| 372227 ||  || — || October 21, 2008 || Mount Lemmon || Mount Lemmon Survey || HYG || align=right | 3.3 km || 
|-id=228 bgcolor=#d6d6d6
| 372228 ||  || — || October 21, 2008 || Kitt Peak || Spacewatch || — || align=right | 4.5 km || 
|-id=229 bgcolor=#d6d6d6
| 372229 ||  || — || October 22, 2008 || Kitt Peak || Spacewatch || — || align=right | 2.9 km || 
|-id=230 bgcolor=#d6d6d6
| 372230 ||  || — || October 22, 2008 || Kitt Peak || Spacewatch || 7:4 || align=right | 3.7 km || 
|-id=231 bgcolor=#d6d6d6
| 372231 ||  || — || October 23, 2008 || Kitt Peak || Spacewatch || — || align=right | 2.5 km || 
|-id=232 bgcolor=#d6d6d6
| 372232 ||  || — || October 28, 2008 || Wrightwood || J. W. Young || — || align=right | 6.6 km || 
|-id=233 bgcolor=#d6d6d6
| 372233 ||  || — || October 27, 2008 || Bisei SG Center || BATTeRS || — || align=right | 3.1 km || 
|-id=234 bgcolor=#d6d6d6
| 372234 ||  || — || October 21, 2008 || Kitt Peak || Spacewatch || HYG || align=right | 3.0 km || 
|-id=235 bgcolor=#d6d6d6
| 372235 ||  || — || October 22, 2008 || Kitt Peak || Spacewatch || URS || align=right | 4.3 km || 
|-id=236 bgcolor=#d6d6d6
| 372236 ||  || — || October 22, 2008 || Kitt Peak || Spacewatch || — || align=right | 3.2 km || 
|-id=237 bgcolor=#d6d6d6
| 372237 ||  || — || October 22, 2008 || Kitt Peak || Spacewatch || — || align=right | 3.2 km || 
|-id=238 bgcolor=#d6d6d6
| 372238 ||  || — || October 22, 2008 || Kitt Peak || Spacewatch || — || align=right | 3.2 km || 
|-id=239 bgcolor=#d6d6d6
| 372239 ||  || — || October 22, 2008 || Kitt Peak || Spacewatch || — || align=right | 4.1 km || 
|-id=240 bgcolor=#d6d6d6
| 372240 ||  || — || October 22, 2008 || Kitt Peak || Spacewatch || EOS || align=right | 2.6 km || 
|-id=241 bgcolor=#d6d6d6
| 372241 ||  || — || October 22, 2008 || Kitt Peak || Spacewatch || — || align=right | 3.2 km || 
|-id=242 bgcolor=#d6d6d6
| 372242 ||  || — || October 22, 2008 || Kitt Peak || Spacewatch || — || align=right | 4.1 km || 
|-id=243 bgcolor=#d6d6d6
| 372243 ||  || — || October 23, 2008 || Kitt Peak || Spacewatch || — || align=right | 4.0 km || 
|-id=244 bgcolor=#d6d6d6
| 372244 ||  || — || October 23, 2008 || Kitt Peak || Spacewatch || — || align=right | 3.4 km || 
|-id=245 bgcolor=#d6d6d6
| 372245 ||  || — || September 22, 2008 || Mount Lemmon || Mount Lemmon Survey || HYG || align=right | 3.2 km || 
|-id=246 bgcolor=#d6d6d6
| 372246 ||  || — || October 23, 2008 || Kitt Peak || Spacewatch || — || align=right | 3.0 km || 
|-id=247 bgcolor=#d6d6d6
| 372247 ||  || — || October 23, 2008 || Kitt Peak || Spacewatch || — || align=right | 2.9 km || 
|-id=248 bgcolor=#d6d6d6
| 372248 ||  || — || October 23, 2008 || Kitt Peak || Spacewatch || — || align=right | 2.4 km || 
|-id=249 bgcolor=#d6d6d6
| 372249 ||  || — || October 23, 2008 || Mount Lemmon || Mount Lemmon Survey || TIR || align=right | 2.9 km || 
|-id=250 bgcolor=#d6d6d6
| 372250 ||  || — || October 23, 2008 || Kitt Peak || Spacewatch || — || align=right | 3.1 km || 
|-id=251 bgcolor=#d6d6d6
| 372251 ||  || — || October 24, 2008 || Kitt Peak || Spacewatch || VER || align=right | 2.3 km || 
|-id=252 bgcolor=#d6d6d6
| 372252 ||  || — || October 24, 2008 || Kitt Peak || Spacewatch || — || align=right | 3.3 km || 
|-id=253 bgcolor=#d6d6d6
| 372253 ||  || — || October 24, 2008 || Mount Lemmon || Mount Lemmon Survey || THM || align=right | 2.1 km || 
|-id=254 bgcolor=#d6d6d6
| 372254 ||  || — || October 25, 2008 || Mount Lemmon || Mount Lemmon Survey || — || align=right | 1.9 km || 
|-id=255 bgcolor=#d6d6d6
| 372255 ||  || — || October 25, 2008 || Catalina || CSS || — || align=right | 3.7 km || 
|-id=256 bgcolor=#d6d6d6
| 372256 ||  || — || October 23, 2008 || Kitt Peak || Spacewatch || — || align=right | 3.9 km || 
|-id=257 bgcolor=#d6d6d6
| 372257 ||  || — || October 23, 2008 || Kitt Peak || Spacewatch || EOS || align=right | 2.0 km || 
|-id=258 bgcolor=#d6d6d6
| 372258 ||  || — || October 24, 2008 || Kitt Peak || Spacewatch || THM || align=right | 2.6 km || 
|-id=259 bgcolor=#d6d6d6
| 372259 ||  || — || October 25, 2008 || Kitt Peak || Spacewatch || HYG || align=right | 3.2 km || 
|-id=260 bgcolor=#d6d6d6
| 372260 ||  || — || October 26, 2008 || Kitt Peak || Spacewatch || — || align=right | 4.3 km || 
|-id=261 bgcolor=#d6d6d6
| 372261 ||  || — || October 26, 2008 || Mount Lemmon || Mount Lemmon Survey || — || align=right | 3.6 km || 
|-id=262 bgcolor=#d6d6d6
| 372262 ||  || — || October 26, 2008 || Kitt Peak || Spacewatch || 7:4 || align=right | 3.2 km || 
|-id=263 bgcolor=#d6d6d6
| 372263 ||  || — || October 27, 2008 || Kitt Peak || Spacewatch || — || align=right | 3.7 km || 
|-id=264 bgcolor=#d6d6d6
| 372264 ||  || — || October 27, 2008 || Kitt Peak || Spacewatch || — || align=right | 3.0 km || 
|-id=265 bgcolor=#d6d6d6
| 372265 ||  || — || October 27, 2008 || Kitt Peak || Spacewatch || — || align=right | 3.3 km || 
|-id=266 bgcolor=#d6d6d6
| 372266 ||  || — || September 22, 2008 || Kitt Peak || Spacewatch || — || align=right | 3.7 km || 
|-id=267 bgcolor=#d6d6d6
| 372267 ||  || — || October 28, 2008 || Kitt Peak || Spacewatch || THM || align=right | 2.0 km || 
|-id=268 bgcolor=#d6d6d6
| 372268 ||  || — || October 28, 2008 || Mount Lemmon || Mount Lemmon Survey || — || align=right | 2.8 km || 
|-id=269 bgcolor=#E9E9E9
| 372269 ||  || — || October 7, 1999 || Socorro || LINEAR || GEF || align=right | 1.5 km || 
|-id=270 bgcolor=#d6d6d6
| 372270 ||  || — || October 29, 2008 || Kitt Peak || Spacewatch || — || align=right | 2.0 km || 
|-id=271 bgcolor=#d6d6d6
| 372271 ||  || — || October 29, 2008 || Mount Lemmon || Mount Lemmon Survey || — || align=right | 3.8 km || 
|-id=272 bgcolor=#d6d6d6
| 372272 ||  || — || October 30, 2008 || Kitt Peak || Spacewatch || — || align=right | 3.0 km || 
|-id=273 bgcolor=#d6d6d6
| 372273 ||  || — || October 30, 2008 || Catalina || CSS || — || align=right | 3.7 km || 
|-id=274 bgcolor=#d6d6d6
| 372274 ||  || — || October 31, 2008 || Mount Lemmon || Mount Lemmon Survey || EOS || align=right | 2.9 km || 
|-id=275 bgcolor=#d6d6d6
| 372275 ||  || — || October 31, 2008 || Mount Lemmon || Mount Lemmon Survey || — || align=right | 3.3 km || 
|-id=276 bgcolor=#d6d6d6
| 372276 ||  || — || October 19, 2008 || Kitt Peak || Spacewatch || — || align=right | 2.8 km || 
|-id=277 bgcolor=#d6d6d6
| 372277 ||  || — || October 25, 2008 || Mount Lemmon || Mount Lemmon Survey || — || align=right | 3.2 km || 
|-id=278 bgcolor=#d6d6d6
| 372278 ||  || — || October 22, 2008 || Kitt Peak || Spacewatch || LIX || align=right | 4.9 km || 
|-id=279 bgcolor=#d6d6d6
| 372279 ||  || — || October 20, 2008 || Mount Lemmon || Mount Lemmon Survey || — || align=right | 4.0 km || 
|-id=280 bgcolor=#d6d6d6
| 372280 ||  || — || October 31, 2008 || Kitt Peak || Spacewatch || THM || align=right | 2.5 km || 
|-id=281 bgcolor=#d6d6d6
| 372281 ||  || — || October 25, 2008 || Mount Lemmon || Mount Lemmon Survey || — || align=right | 3.0 km || 
|-id=282 bgcolor=#d6d6d6
| 372282 ||  || — || October 26, 2008 || Mount Lemmon || Mount Lemmon Survey || 7:4 || align=right | 3.8 km || 
|-id=283 bgcolor=#d6d6d6
| 372283 ||  || — || October 26, 2008 || Mount Lemmon || Mount Lemmon Survey || LIX || align=right | 4.5 km || 
|-id=284 bgcolor=#d6d6d6
| 372284 ||  || — || October 23, 2008 || Kitt Peak || Spacewatch || HYG || align=right | 3.2 km || 
|-id=285 bgcolor=#d6d6d6
| 372285 ||  || — || October 26, 2008 || Catalina || CSS || — || align=right | 3.6 km || 
|-id=286 bgcolor=#d6d6d6
| 372286 ||  || — || October 24, 2008 || Kitt Peak || Spacewatch || — || align=right | 2.9 km || 
|-id=287 bgcolor=#d6d6d6
| 372287 ||  || — || October 26, 2008 || Mount Lemmon || Mount Lemmon Survey || HYG || align=right | 2.9 km || 
|-id=288 bgcolor=#d6d6d6
| 372288 ||  || — || November 2, 2008 || Socorro || LINEAR || — || align=right | 5.4 km || 
|-id=289 bgcolor=#d6d6d6
| 372289 ||  || — || November 3, 2008 || Socorro || LINEAR || EUP || align=right | 6.1 km || 
|-id=290 bgcolor=#d6d6d6
| 372290 ||  || — || November 1, 2008 || Mount Lemmon || Mount Lemmon Survey || — || align=right | 4.2 km || 
|-id=291 bgcolor=#d6d6d6
| 372291 ||  || — || November 2, 2008 || Mount Lemmon || Mount Lemmon Survey || — || align=right | 4.0 km || 
|-id=292 bgcolor=#d6d6d6
| 372292 ||  || — || November 1, 2008 || Kitt Peak || Spacewatch || — || align=right | 2.6 km || 
|-id=293 bgcolor=#d6d6d6
| 372293 ||  || — || November 1, 2008 || Kitt Peak || Spacewatch || — || align=right | 3.7 km || 
|-id=294 bgcolor=#d6d6d6
| 372294 ||  || — || October 8, 2008 || Kitt Peak || Spacewatch || — || align=right | 3.7 km || 
|-id=295 bgcolor=#d6d6d6
| 372295 ||  || — || November 2, 2008 || Kitt Peak || Spacewatch || — || align=right | 2.8 km || 
|-id=296 bgcolor=#d6d6d6
| 372296 ||  || — || November 6, 2008 || Kitt Peak || Spacewatch || URS || align=right | 3.9 km || 
|-id=297 bgcolor=#d6d6d6
| 372297 ||  || — || November 6, 2008 || Mount Lemmon || Mount Lemmon Survey || — || align=right | 2.8 km || 
|-id=298 bgcolor=#d6d6d6
| 372298 ||  || — || November 7, 2008 || Catalina || CSS || — || align=right | 4.0 km || 
|-id=299 bgcolor=#d6d6d6
| 372299 ||  || — || November 6, 2008 || Mount Lemmon || Mount Lemmon Survey || 7:4 || align=right | 4.6 km || 
|-id=300 bgcolor=#d6d6d6
| 372300 ||  || — || November 6, 2008 || Mount Lemmon || Mount Lemmon Survey || — || align=right | 3.3 km || 
|}

372301–372400 

|-bgcolor=#d6d6d6
| 372301 ||  || — || October 31, 2008 || Kitt Peak || Spacewatch || — || align=right | 3.2 km || 
|-id=302 bgcolor=#d6d6d6
| 372302 ||  || — || November 9, 2008 || Mount Lemmon || Mount Lemmon Survey || THM || align=right | 2.4 km || 
|-id=303 bgcolor=#fefefe
| 372303 ||  || — || November 21, 2008 || Kitt Peak || Spacewatch || H || align=right data-sort-value="0.78" | 780 m || 
|-id=304 bgcolor=#d6d6d6
| 372304 ||  || — || November 22, 2008 || Hibiscus || N. Teamo || VER || align=right | 5.5 km || 
|-id=305 bgcolor=#d6d6d6
| 372305 Bourdeille ||  ||  || November 20, 2008 || Vicques || M. Ory || THM || align=right | 1.9 km || 
|-id=306 bgcolor=#d6d6d6
| 372306 ||  || — || November 20, 2008 || Socorro || LINEAR || — || align=right | 3.2 km || 
|-id=307 bgcolor=#d6d6d6
| 372307 ||  || — || November 18, 2008 || Kitt Peak || Spacewatch || — || align=right | 2.3 km || 
|-id=308 bgcolor=#d6d6d6
| 372308 ||  || — || November 18, 2008 || Kitt Peak || Spacewatch || THM || align=right | 2.6 km || 
|-id=309 bgcolor=#d6d6d6
| 372309 ||  || — || November 21, 2008 || Kitt Peak || Spacewatch || — || align=right | 5.1 km || 
|-id=310 bgcolor=#d6d6d6
| 372310 ||  || — || November 29, 2008 || Mayhill || A. Lowe || — || align=right | 3.2 km || 
|-id=311 bgcolor=#d6d6d6
| 372311 ||  || — || November 30, 2008 || Catalina || CSS || — || align=right | 4.2 km || 
|-id=312 bgcolor=#d6d6d6
| 372312 ||  || — || November 30, 2008 || Kitt Peak || Spacewatch || THM || align=right | 2.4 km || 
|-id=313 bgcolor=#d6d6d6
| 372313 ||  || — || November 30, 2008 || Kitt Peak || Spacewatch || 7:4 || align=right | 3.3 km || 
|-id=314 bgcolor=#d6d6d6
| 372314 ||  || — || November 18, 2008 || Kitt Peak || Spacewatch || — || align=right | 6.4 km || 
|-id=315 bgcolor=#d6d6d6
| 372315 ||  || — || November 19, 2008 || Catalina || CSS || — || align=right | 2.6 km || 
|-id=316 bgcolor=#d6d6d6
| 372316 ||  || — || December 2, 2008 || Socorro || LINEAR || — || align=right | 3.8 km || 
|-id=317 bgcolor=#d6d6d6
| 372317 ||  || — || December 1, 2008 || Kitt Peak || Spacewatch || KOR || align=right | 1.5 km || 
|-id=318 bgcolor=#d6d6d6
| 372318 ||  || — || December 2, 2008 || Kitt Peak || Spacewatch || — || align=right | 3.7 km || 
|-id=319 bgcolor=#d6d6d6
| 372319 ||  || — || December 4, 2008 || Kitt Peak || Spacewatch || THM || align=right | 2.2 km || 
|-id=320 bgcolor=#d6d6d6
| 372320 ||  || — || December 1, 2008 || Socorro || LINEAR || HYG || align=right | 3.4 km || 
|-id=321 bgcolor=#d6d6d6
| 372321 ||  || — || December 21, 2008 || Dauban || F. Kugel || THM || align=right | 2.6 km || 
|-id=322 bgcolor=#d6d6d6
| 372322 ||  || — || December 23, 2008 || Dauban || F. Kugel || ARM || align=right | 5.2 km || 
|-id=323 bgcolor=#d6d6d6
| 372323 ||  || — || November 19, 2008 || Mount Lemmon || Mount Lemmon Survey || — || align=right | 4.4 km || 
|-id=324 bgcolor=#d6d6d6
| 372324 ||  || — || December 20, 2008 || La Sagra || OAM Obs. || THM || align=right | 2.3 km || 
|-id=325 bgcolor=#FA8072
| 372325 ||  || — || December 21, 2008 || Catalina || CSS || — || align=right data-sort-value="0.83" | 830 m || 
|-id=326 bgcolor=#d6d6d6
| 372326 ||  || — || January 1, 2009 || Mount Lemmon || Mount Lemmon Survey || 3:2 || align=right | 6.7 km || 
|-id=327 bgcolor=#d6d6d6
| 372327 ||  || — || January 16, 2009 || Kitt Peak || Spacewatch || — || align=right | 6.0 km || 
|-id=328 bgcolor=#fefefe
| 372328 ||  || — || December 31, 2008 || Mount Lemmon || Mount Lemmon Survey || — || align=right data-sort-value="0.75" | 750 m || 
|-id=329 bgcolor=#fefefe
| 372329 ||  || — || January 23, 2009 || Purple Mountain || PMO NEO || H || align=right data-sort-value="0.54" | 540 m || 
|-id=330 bgcolor=#fefefe
| 372330 ||  || — || January 28, 2009 || Catalina || CSS || H || align=right data-sort-value="0.76" | 760 m || 
|-id=331 bgcolor=#fefefe
| 372331 ||  || — || January 30, 2009 || Kitt Peak || Spacewatch || H || align=right data-sort-value="0.59" | 590 m || 
|-id=332 bgcolor=#fefefe
| 372332 ||  || — || January 31, 2009 || Mount Lemmon || Mount Lemmon Survey || FLO || align=right data-sort-value="0.72" | 720 m || 
|-id=333 bgcolor=#d6d6d6
| 372333 ||  || — || February 1, 2009 || Kitt Peak || Spacewatch || — || align=right | 4.3 km || 
|-id=334 bgcolor=#fefefe
| 372334 ||  || — || December 30, 2008 || Catalina || CSS || H || align=right data-sort-value="0.75" | 750 m || 
|-id=335 bgcolor=#fefefe
| 372335 ||  || — || February 4, 2009 || Catalina || CSS || H || align=right | 1.00 km || 
|-id=336 bgcolor=#fefefe
| 372336 ||  || — || February 16, 2009 || Kitt Peak || Spacewatch || FLO || align=right data-sort-value="0.51" | 510 m || 
|-id=337 bgcolor=#fefefe
| 372337 ||  || — || February 24, 2009 || Kitt Peak || Spacewatch || — || align=right data-sort-value="0.69" | 690 m || 
|-id=338 bgcolor=#fefefe
| 372338 ||  || — || February 24, 2009 || Kitt Peak || Spacewatch || — || align=right data-sort-value="0.75" | 750 m || 
|-id=339 bgcolor=#fefefe
| 372339 ||  || — || February 24, 2009 || Kitt Peak || Spacewatch || — || align=right data-sort-value="0.73" | 730 m || 
|-id=340 bgcolor=#fefefe
| 372340 ||  || — || February 28, 2009 || Mount Lemmon || Mount Lemmon Survey || — || align=right | 1.0 km || 
|-id=341 bgcolor=#fefefe
| 372341 ||  || — || February 28, 2009 || Mount Lemmon || Mount Lemmon Survey || — || align=right data-sort-value="0.83" | 830 m || 
|-id=342 bgcolor=#FA8072
| 372342 ||  || — || February 26, 2009 || Kitt Peak || Spacewatch || — || align=right data-sort-value="0.93" | 930 m || 
|-id=343 bgcolor=#fefefe
| 372343 ||  || — || March 3, 2009 || Kitt Peak || Spacewatch || NYS || align=right data-sort-value="0.52" | 520 m || 
|-id=344 bgcolor=#fefefe
| 372344 ||  || — || March 1, 2009 || Mount Lemmon || Mount Lemmon Survey || — || align=right data-sort-value="0.75" | 750 m || 
|-id=345 bgcolor=#fefefe
| 372345 ||  || — || March 21, 2009 || Mount Lemmon || Mount Lemmon Survey || — || align=right data-sort-value="0.62" | 620 m || 
|-id=346 bgcolor=#fefefe
| 372346 ||  || — || March 19, 2009 || Bergisch Gladbach || W. Bickel || FLO || align=right data-sort-value="0.54" | 540 m || 
|-id=347 bgcolor=#fefefe
| 372347 ||  || — || March 25, 2009 || La Sagra || OAM Obs. || PHO || align=right | 1.8 km || 
|-id=348 bgcolor=#fefefe
| 372348 ||  || — || March 26, 2009 || Mount Lemmon || Mount Lemmon Survey || critical || align=right data-sort-value="0.47" | 470 m || 
|-id=349 bgcolor=#fefefe
| 372349 ||  || — || March 23, 2009 || XuYi || PMO NEO || — || align=right data-sort-value="0.78" | 780 m || 
|-id=350 bgcolor=#fefefe
| 372350 ||  || — || March 16, 2009 || Kitt Peak || Spacewatch || — || align=right data-sort-value="0.83" | 830 m || 
|-id=351 bgcolor=#fefefe
| 372351 ||  || — || March 24, 2009 || Kitt Peak || Spacewatch || FLO || align=right data-sort-value="0.60" | 600 m || 
|-id=352 bgcolor=#fefefe
| 372352 ||  || — || March 28, 2009 || Kitt Peak || Spacewatch || FLO || align=right data-sort-value="0.44" | 440 m || 
|-id=353 bgcolor=#fefefe
| 372353 ||  || — || March 29, 2009 || Kitt Peak || Spacewatch || — || align=right data-sort-value="0.71" | 710 m || 
|-id=354 bgcolor=#fefefe
| 372354 ||  || — || March 31, 2009 || Kitt Peak || Spacewatch || — || align=right data-sort-value="0.62" | 620 m || 
|-id=355 bgcolor=#fefefe
| 372355 ||  || — || April 17, 2009 || Catalina || CSS || — || align=right data-sort-value="0.71" | 710 m || 
|-id=356 bgcolor=#fefefe
| 372356 ||  || — || March 29, 2009 || Kitt Peak || Spacewatch || FLO || align=right data-sort-value="0.55" | 550 m || 
|-id=357 bgcolor=#fefefe
| 372357 ||  || — || March 24, 2009 || Mount Lemmon || Mount Lemmon Survey || — || align=right data-sort-value="0.88" | 880 m || 
|-id=358 bgcolor=#fefefe
| 372358 ||  || — || April 16, 2009 || Catalina || CSS || — || align=right data-sort-value="0.71" | 710 m || 
|-id=359 bgcolor=#fefefe
| 372359 ||  || — || April 19, 2009 || Kitt Peak || Spacewatch || — || align=right data-sort-value="0.70" | 700 m || 
|-id=360 bgcolor=#fefefe
| 372360 ||  || — || April 20, 2009 || Kitt Peak || Spacewatch || — || align=right data-sort-value="0.63" | 630 m || 
|-id=361 bgcolor=#fefefe
| 372361 ||  || — || September 30, 2003 || Kitt Peak || Spacewatch || — || align=right data-sort-value="0.72" | 720 m || 
|-id=362 bgcolor=#fefefe
| 372362 ||  || — || April 21, 2009 || La Sagra || OAM Obs. || — || align=right data-sort-value="0.57" | 570 m || 
|-id=363 bgcolor=#fefefe
| 372363 ||  || — || April 30, 2009 || Kitt Peak || Spacewatch || — || align=right data-sort-value="0.92" | 920 m || 
|-id=364 bgcolor=#fefefe
| 372364 ||  || — || April 20, 2009 || Mount Lemmon || Mount Lemmon Survey || — || align=right data-sort-value="0.71" | 710 m || 
|-id=365 bgcolor=#fefefe
| 372365 ||  || — || March 2, 2009 || Mount Lemmon || Mount Lemmon Survey || ERI || align=right | 2.4 km || 
|-id=366 bgcolor=#fefefe
| 372366 ||  || — || May 13, 2009 || Mount Lemmon || Mount Lemmon Survey || — || align=right | 1.0 km || 
|-id=367 bgcolor=#fefefe
| 372367 ||  || — || May 21, 2009 || Cerro Burek || Alianza S4 Obs. || FLO || align=right data-sort-value="0.61" | 610 m || 
|-id=368 bgcolor=#fefefe
| 372368 ||  || — || May 29, 2009 || Mount Lemmon || Mount Lemmon Survey || — || align=right data-sort-value="0.87" | 870 m || 
|-id=369 bgcolor=#FA8072
| 372369 ||  || — || June 2, 2009 || La Sagra || OAM Obs. || PHO || align=right | 1.7 km || 
|-id=370 bgcolor=#fefefe
| 372370 ||  || — || June 12, 2009 || Kitt Peak || Spacewatch || — || align=right data-sort-value="0.81" | 810 m || 
|-id=371 bgcolor=#fefefe
| 372371 ||  || — || May 28, 2009 || Mount Lemmon || Mount Lemmon Survey || — || align=right | 1.4 km || 
|-id=372 bgcolor=#fefefe
| 372372 ||  || — || July 19, 2009 || La Sagra || OAM Obs. || MAS || align=right data-sort-value="0.82" | 820 m || 
|-id=373 bgcolor=#fefefe
| 372373 ||  || — || July 21, 2009 || La Sagra || OAM Obs. || — || align=right | 1.1 km || 
|-id=374 bgcolor=#fefefe
| 372374 ||  || — || July 25, 2009 || La Sagra || OAM Obs. || NYS || align=right data-sort-value="0.92" | 920 m || 
|-id=375 bgcolor=#fefefe
| 372375 ||  || — || July 28, 2009 || La Sagra || OAM Obs. || LCI || align=right | 1.4 km || 
|-id=376 bgcolor=#fefefe
| 372376 ||  || — || March 2, 2008 || Kitt Peak || Spacewatch || — || align=right | 1.2 km || 
|-id=377 bgcolor=#fefefe
| 372377 ||  || — || August 14, 2009 || La Sagra || OAM Obs. || — || align=right | 1.2 km || 
|-id=378 bgcolor=#fefefe
| 372378 ||  || — || August 14, 2009 || La Sagra || OAM Obs. || — || align=right data-sort-value="0.82" | 820 m || 
|-id=379 bgcolor=#fefefe
| 372379 ||  || — || August 14, 2009 || La Sagra || OAM Obs. || — || align=right data-sort-value="0.88" | 880 m || 
|-id=380 bgcolor=#fefefe
| 372380 ||  || — || August 15, 2009 || Kitt Peak || Spacewatch || — || align=right | 1.3 km || 
|-id=381 bgcolor=#fefefe
| 372381 ||  || — || September 11, 2005 || Kitt Peak || Spacewatch || V || align=right data-sort-value="0.78" | 780 m || 
|-id=382 bgcolor=#fefefe
| 372382 ||  || — || November 16, 2006 || Kitt Peak || Spacewatch || V || align=right data-sort-value="0.71" | 710 m || 
|-id=383 bgcolor=#E9E9E9
| 372383 ||  || — || August 15, 2009 || Kitt Peak || Spacewatch || — || align=right | 1.5 km || 
|-id=384 bgcolor=#fefefe
| 372384 ||  || — || August 15, 2009 || Kitt Peak || Spacewatch || — || align=right data-sort-value="0.76" | 760 m || 
|-id=385 bgcolor=#E9E9E9
| 372385 ||  || — || August 22, 2009 || Pla D'Arguines || R. Ferrando || — || align=right | 2.5 km || 
|-id=386 bgcolor=#E9E9E9
| 372386 ||  || — || August 16, 2009 || Kitt Peak || Spacewatch || — || align=right data-sort-value="0.79" | 790 m || 
|-id=387 bgcolor=#E9E9E9
| 372387 ||  || — || August 16, 2009 || Kitt Peak || Spacewatch || — || align=right data-sort-value="0.81" | 810 m || 
|-id=388 bgcolor=#E9E9E9
| 372388 ||  || — || August 16, 2009 || Kitt Peak || Spacewatch || — || align=right data-sort-value="0.72" | 720 m || 
|-id=389 bgcolor=#E9E9E9
| 372389 ||  || — || August 16, 2009 || Kitt Peak || Spacewatch || — || align=right data-sort-value="0.88" | 880 m || 
|-id=390 bgcolor=#fefefe
| 372390 ||  || — || August 19, 2009 || La Sagra || OAM Obs. || — || align=right data-sort-value="0.99" | 990 m || 
|-id=391 bgcolor=#E9E9E9
| 372391 ||  || — || August 20, 2009 || La Sagra || OAM Obs. || BRG || align=right | 1.5 km || 
|-id=392 bgcolor=#E9E9E9
| 372392 ||  || — || August 19, 2009 || Catalina || CSS || — || align=right | 2.3 km || 
|-id=393 bgcolor=#fefefe
| 372393 ||  || — || August 27, 2009 || Sierra Stars || R. Matson || — || align=right data-sort-value="0.82" | 820 m || 
|-id=394 bgcolor=#E9E9E9
| 372394 ||  || — || August 28, 2009 || Socorro || LINEAR || HNS || align=right | 1.5 km || 
|-id=395 bgcolor=#E9E9E9
| 372395 ||  || — || August 26, 2009 || Wildberg || R. Apitzsch || — || align=right | 1.0 km || 
|-id=396 bgcolor=#E9E9E9
| 372396 ||  || — || August 27, 2009 || Kitt Peak || Spacewatch || — || align=right data-sort-value="0.81" | 810 m || 
|-id=397 bgcolor=#fefefe
| 372397 ||  || — || August 27, 2009 || Kitt Peak || Spacewatch || NYS || align=right data-sort-value="0.86" | 860 m || 
|-id=398 bgcolor=#fefefe
| 372398 ||  || — || August 19, 2009 || Kitt Peak || Spacewatch || V || align=right data-sort-value="0.79" | 790 m || 
|-id=399 bgcolor=#E9E9E9
| 372399 ||  || — || August 29, 2009 || Kitt Peak || Spacewatch || EUN || align=right | 1.3 km || 
|-id=400 bgcolor=#fefefe
| 372400 ||  || — || September 11, 2009 || La Sagra || OAM Obs. || CIM || align=right | 2.4 km || 
|}

372401–372500 

|-bgcolor=#E9E9E9
| 372401 ||  || — || September 12, 2009 || Kitt Peak || Spacewatch || HNS || align=right | 1.1 km || 
|-id=402 bgcolor=#E9E9E9
| 372402 ||  || — || September 12, 2009 || Kitt Peak || Spacewatch || MAR || align=right | 1.3 km || 
|-id=403 bgcolor=#E9E9E9
| 372403 ||  || — || September 12, 2009 || Kitt Peak || Spacewatch || — || align=right | 1.6 km || 
|-id=404 bgcolor=#E9E9E9
| 372404 ||  || — || September 12, 2009 || Kitt Peak || Spacewatch || — || align=right | 1.7 km || 
|-id=405 bgcolor=#E9E9E9
| 372405 ||  || — || November 21, 2005 || Kitt Peak || Spacewatch || — || align=right | 1.3 km || 
|-id=406 bgcolor=#fefefe
| 372406 ||  || — || July 31, 2009 || Kitt Peak || Spacewatch || V || align=right data-sort-value="0.66" | 660 m || 
|-id=407 bgcolor=#E9E9E9
| 372407 ||  || — || September 14, 2009 || Kitt Peak || Spacewatch || EUN || align=right | 1.7 km || 
|-id=408 bgcolor=#fefefe
| 372408 ||  || — || September 15, 2009 || Kitt Peak || Spacewatch || V || align=right data-sort-value="0.69" | 690 m || 
|-id=409 bgcolor=#E9E9E9
| 372409 ||  || — || September 15, 2009 || Kitt Peak || Spacewatch || — || align=right data-sort-value="0.83" | 830 m || 
|-id=410 bgcolor=#E9E9E9
| 372410 ||  || — || September 15, 2009 || Kitt Peak || Spacewatch || — || align=right | 2.1 km || 
|-id=411 bgcolor=#E9E9E9
| 372411 ||  || — || September 15, 2009 || Kitt Peak || Spacewatch || PAD || align=right | 1.8 km || 
|-id=412 bgcolor=#E9E9E9
| 372412 ||  || — || September 15, 2009 || Kitt Peak || Spacewatch || — || align=right data-sort-value="0.95" | 950 m || 
|-id=413 bgcolor=#E9E9E9
| 372413 ||  || — || September 15, 2009 || Kitt Peak || Spacewatch || — || align=right | 1.4 km || 
|-id=414 bgcolor=#E9E9E9
| 372414 ||  || — || November 25, 2005 || Catalina || CSS || IAN || align=right data-sort-value="0.83" | 830 m || 
|-id=415 bgcolor=#E9E9E9
| 372415 ||  || — || September 15, 2009 || Kitt Peak || Spacewatch || — || align=right | 2.1 km || 
|-id=416 bgcolor=#E9E9E9
| 372416 ||  || — || September 15, 2009 || Kitt Peak || Spacewatch || — || align=right | 2.3 km || 
|-id=417 bgcolor=#E9E9E9
| 372417 ||  || — || September 15, 2009 || Kitt Peak || Spacewatch || — || align=right | 2.3 km || 
|-id=418 bgcolor=#E9E9E9
| 372418 ||  || — || September 15, 2009 || Kitt Peak || Spacewatch || — || align=right | 2.6 km || 
|-id=419 bgcolor=#E9E9E9
| 372419 ||  || — || September 11, 2009 || Catalina || CSS || MAR || align=right | 1.4 km || 
|-id=420 bgcolor=#fefefe
| 372420 ||  || — || September 14, 2009 || La Sagra || OAM Obs. || MAS || align=right data-sort-value="0.96" | 960 m || 
|-id=421 bgcolor=#E9E9E9
| 372421 ||  || — || September 16, 2009 || Kachina || J. Hobart || — || align=right data-sort-value="0.98" | 980 m || 
|-id=422 bgcolor=#E9E9E9
| 372422 ||  || — || September 16, 2009 || Kitt Peak || Spacewatch || — || align=right | 1.7 km || 
|-id=423 bgcolor=#E9E9E9
| 372423 ||  || — || April 11, 2003 || Kitt Peak || Spacewatch || EUN || align=right | 1.2 km || 
|-id=424 bgcolor=#E9E9E9
| 372424 ||  || — || September 16, 2009 || Kitt Peak || Spacewatch || — || align=right data-sort-value="0.77" | 770 m || 
|-id=425 bgcolor=#E9E9E9
| 372425 ||  || — || September 16, 2009 || Kitt Peak || Spacewatch || — || align=right data-sort-value="0.98" | 980 m || 
|-id=426 bgcolor=#E9E9E9
| 372426 ||  || — || September 16, 2009 || Kitt Peak || Spacewatch || GEF || align=right | 1.3 km || 
|-id=427 bgcolor=#E9E9E9
| 372427 ||  || — || September 16, 2009 || Kitt Peak || Spacewatch || — || align=right | 2.3 km || 
|-id=428 bgcolor=#E9E9E9
| 372428 ||  || — || September 16, 2009 || Kitt Peak || Spacewatch || — || align=right | 1.3 km || 
|-id=429 bgcolor=#E9E9E9
| 372429 ||  || — || September 16, 2009 || Kitt Peak || Spacewatch || — || align=right | 1.7 km || 
|-id=430 bgcolor=#E9E9E9
| 372430 ||  || — || September 16, 2009 || Kitt Peak || Spacewatch || GEF || align=right | 1.3 km || 
|-id=431 bgcolor=#E9E9E9
| 372431 ||  || — || September 16, 2009 || Kitt Peak || Spacewatch || WIT || align=right | 1.1 km || 
|-id=432 bgcolor=#E9E9E9
| 372432 ||  || — || September 16, 2009 || Kitt Peak || Spacewatch || — || align=right | 1.4 km || 
|-id=433 bgcolor=#E9E9E9
| 372433 ||  || — || September 16, 2009 || Kitt Peak || Spacewatch || MRX || align=right data-sort-value="0.92" | 920 m || 
|-id=434 bgcolor=#E9E9E9
| 372434 ||  || — || September 16, 2009 || Kitt Peak || Spacewatch || AGN || align=right | 1.5 km || 
|-id=435 bgcolor=#E9E9E9
| 372435 ||  || — || September 17, 2009 || La Sagra || OAM Obs. || ADE || align=right | 2.0 km || 
|-id=436 bgcolor=#E9E9E9
| 372436 ||  || — || September 17, 2009 || Catalina || CSS || — || align=right | 1.0 km || 
|-id=437 bgcolor=#E9E9E9
| 372437 ||  || — || August 27, 2009 || Kitt Peak || Spacewatch || — || align=right | 1.2 km || 
|-id=438 bgcolor=#E9E9E9
| 372438 ||  || — || March 11, 2007 || Kitt Peak || Spacewatch || — || align=right | 2.7 km || 
|-id=439 bgcolor=#E9E9E9
| 372439 ||  || — || November 4, 2005 || Mount Lemmon || Mount Lemmon Survey || — || align=right | 1.4 km || 
|-id=440 bgcolor=#fefefe
| 372440 ||  || — || September 17, 2009 || Mount Lemmon || Mount Lemmon Survey || — || align=right data-sort-value="0.69" | 690 m || 
|-id=441 bgcolor=#E9E9E9
| 372441 ||  || — || September 17, 2009 || Mount Lemmon || Mount Lemmon Survey || — || align=right | 1.4 km || 
|-id=442 bgcolor=#E9E9E9
| 372442 ||  || — || September 17, 2009 || Mount Lemmon || Mount Lemmon Survey || — || align=right | 1.3 km || 
|-id=443 bgcolor=#E9E9E9
| 372443 ||  || — || September 17, 2009 || Kitt Peak || Spacewatch || HOF || align=right | 2.5 km || 
|-id=444 bgcolor=#E9E9E9
| 372444 ||  || — || September 18, 2009 || Kitt Peak || Spacewatch || — || align=right | 2.2 km || 
|-id=445 bgcolor=#E9E9E9
| 372445 ||  || — || September 18, 2009 || Mount Lemmon || Mount Lemmon Survey || — || align=right | 1.9 km || 
|-id=446 bgcolor=#E9E9E9
| 372446 ||  || — || September 12, 2009 || Kitt Peak || Spacewatch || — || align=right | 2.4 km || 
|-id=447 bgcolor=#E9E9E9
| 372447 ||  || — || September 19, 2009 || Kitt Peak || Spacewatch || — || align=right | 1.2 km || 
|-id=448 bgcolor=#E9E9E9
| 372448 ||  || — || September 19, 2009 || Mount Lemmon || Mount Lemmon Survey || HOF || align=right | 2.7 km || 
|-id=449 bgcolor=#E9E9E9
| 372449 ||  || — || September 18, 2009 || Kitt Peak || Spacewatch || — || align=right | 1.6 km || 
|-id=450 bgcolor=#d6d6d6
| 372450 ||  || — || September 26, 2009 || Mount Lemmon || Mount Lemmon Survey || EUP || align=right | 5.9 km || 
|-id=451 bgcolor=#E9E9E9
| 372451 ||  || — || September 18, 2009 || Kitt Peak || Spacewatch || — || align=right data-sort-value="0.96" | 960 m || 
|-id=452 bgcolor=#E9E9E9
| 372452 ||  || — || September 18, 2009 || Kitt Peak || Spacewatch || — || align=right | 2.5 km || 
|-id=453 bgcolor=#E9E9E9
| 372453 ||  || — || September 18, 2009 || Kitt Peak || Spacewatch || — || align=right | 1.7 km || 
|-id=454 bgcolor=#E9E9E9
| 372454 ||  || — || September 18, 2009 || Kitt Peak || Spacewatch || — || align=right data-sort-value="0.92" | 920 m || 
|-id=455 bgcolor=#E9E9E9
| 372455 ||  || — || September 18, 2009 || Kitt Peak || Spacewatch || — || align=right | 2.2 km || 
|-id=456 bgcolor=#E9E9E9
| 372456 ||  || — || September 18, 2009 || Kitt Peak || Spacewatch || — || align=right | 1.1 km || 
|-id=457 bgcolor=#E9E9E9
| 372457 ||  || — || September 18, 2009 || Kitt Peak || Spacewatch || — || align=right | 1.9 km || 
|-id=458 bgcolor=#E9E9E9
| 372458 ||  || — || September 18, 2009 || Kitt Peak || Spacewatch || ADE || align=right | 2.4 km || 
|-id=459 bgcolor=#E9E9E9
| 372459 ||  || — || September 18, 2009 || Kitt Peak || Spacewatch || — || align=right | 1.1 km || 
|-id=460 bgcolor=#E9E9E9
| 372460 ||  || — || September 18, 2009 || Kitt Peak || Spacewatch || — || align=right | 1.3 km || 
|-id=461 bgcolor=#E9E9E9
| 372461 ||  || — || September 18, 2009 || Mount Lemmon || Mount Lemmon Survey || WIT || align=right | 1.1 km || 
|-id=462 bgcolor=#E9E9E9
| 372462 ||  || — || September 19, 2009 || Kitt Peak || Spacewatch || — || align=right | 1.9 km || 
|-id=463 bgcolor=#E9E9E9
| 372463 ||  || — || September 19, 2009 || Mount Lemmon || Mount Lemmon Survey || — || align=right | 1.4 km || 
|-id=464 bgcolor=#E9E9E9
| 372464 ||  || — || September 19, 2009 || Kitt Peak || Spacewatch || — || align=right | 1.6 km || 
|-id=465 bgcolor=#E9E9E9
| 372465 ||  || — || September 20, 2009 || Kitt Peak || Spacewatch || — || align=right data-sort-value="0.85" | 850 m || 
|-id=466 bgcolor=#E9E9E9
| 372466 ||  || — || September 20, 2009 || Kitt Peak || Spacewatch || — || align=right data-sort-value="0.86" | 860 m || 
|-id=467 bgcolor=#E9E9E9
| 372467 ||  || — || September 14, 2009 || Kitt Peak || Spacewatch || — || align=right | 3.7 km || 
|-id=468 bgcolor=#E9E9E9
| 372468 ||  || — || September 20, 2009 || Mount Lemmon || Mount Lemmon Survey || — || align=right | 2.7 km || 
|-id=469 bgcolor=#E9E9E9
| 372469 ||  || — || September 20, 2009 || Kitt Peak || Spacewatch || — || align=right | 1.1 km || 
|-id=470 bgcolor=#E9E9E9
| 372470 ||  || — || September 26, 2009 || Saint-Sulpice || B. Christophe || — || align=right | 1.5 km || 
|-id=471 bgcolor=#E9E9E9
| 372471 ||  || — || October 22, 2005 || Kitt Peak || Spacewatch || — || align=right | 1.4 km || 
|-id=472 bgcolor=#E9E9E9
| 372472 ||  || — || September 21, 2009 || Kitt Peak || Spacewatch || — || align=right | 2.0 km || 
|-id=473 bgcolor=#E9E9E9
| 372473 ||  || — || September 21, 2009 || Kitt Peak || Spacewatch || — || align=right | 1.1 km || 
|-id=474 bgcolor=#E9E9E9
| 372474 ||  || — || September 21, 2009 || Kitt Peak || Spacewatch || — || align=right | 1.4 km || 
|-id=475 bgcolor=#E9E9E9
| 372475 ||  || — || September 21, 2009 || Kitt Peak || Spacewatch || — || align=right | 1.2 km || 
|-id=476 bgcolor=#E9E9E9
| 372476 ||  || — || September 22, 2009 || Kitt Peak || Spacewatch || — || align=right data-sort-value="0.83" | 830 m || 
|-id=477 bgcolor=#E9E9E9
| 372477 ||  || — || September 22, 2009 || Kitt Peak || Spacewatch || GEF || align=right | 1.3 km || 
|-id=478 bgcolor=#E9E9E9
| 372478 ||  || — || September 22, 2009 || Kitt Peak || Spacewatch || ADE || align=right | 2.1 km || 
|-id=479 bgcolor=#E9E9E9
| 372479 ||  || — || September 22, 2009 || Kitt Peak || Spacewatch || EUN || align=right | 1.5 km || 
|-id=480 bgcolor=#E9E9E9
| 372480 ||  || — || September 22, 2009 || Kitt Peak || Spacewatch || HNS || align=right | 1.5 km || 
|-id=481 bgcolor=#E9E9E9
| 372481 ||  || — || September 23, 2009 || Kitt Peak || Spacewatch || NEM || align=right | 2.1 km || 
|-id=482 bgcolor=#E9E9E9
| 372482 ||  || — || September 23, 2009 || Kitt Peak || Spacewatch || — || align=right | 1.5 km || 
|-id=483 bgcolor=#E9E9E9
| 372483 ||  || — || September 23, 2009 || Kitt Peak || Spacewatch || AER || align=right | 1.6 km || 
|-id=484 bgcolor=#E9E9E9
| 372484 ||  || — || September 23, 2009 || Kitt Peak || Spacewatch || — || align=right | 2.3 km || 
|-id=485 bgcolor=#E9E9E9
| 372485 ||  || — || September 24, 2009 || Kitt Peak || Spacewatch || — || align=right | 1.4 km || 
|-id=486 bgcolor=#E9E9E9
| 372486 ||  || — || September 16, 2009 || Kitt Peak || Spacewatch || — || align=right | 1.6 km || 
|-id=487 bgcolor=#E9E9E9
| 372487 ||  || — || September 25, 2009 || Mount Lemmon || Mount Lemmon Survey || — || align=right | 2.0 km || 
|-id=488 bgcolor=#E9E9E9
| 372488 ||  || — || September 19, 2009 || Kitt Peak || Spacewatch || — || align=right | 1.4 km || 
|-id=489 bgcolor=#E9E9E9
| 372489 ||  || — || September 19, 2009 || Catalina || CSS || — || align=right | 1.5 km || 
|-id=490 bgcolor=#E9E9E9
| 372490 ||  || — || September 18, 2009 || Catalina || CSS || — || align=right | 1.5 km || 
|-id=491 bgcolor=#E9E9E9
| 372491 ||  || — || September 18, 2009 || Catalina || CSS || JUL || align=right | 1.6 km || 
|-id=492 bgcolor=#E9E9E9
| 372492 ||  || — || September 18, 2009 || Catalina || CSS || BRU || align=right | 2.8 km || 
|-id=493 bgcolor=#E9E9E9
| 372493 ||  || — || September 24, 2009 || La Sagra || OAM Obs. || — || align=right | 1.1 km || 
|-id=494 bgcolor=#E9E9E9
| 372494 ||  || — || September 18, 2009 || Kitt Peak || Spacewatch || — || align=right data-sort-value="0.71" | 710 m || 
|-id=495 bgcolor=#E9E9E9
| 372495 ||  || — || September 18, 2009 || Kitt Peak || Spacewatch || — || align=right | 1.3 km || 
|-id=496 bgcolor=#E9E9E9
| 372496 ||  || — || September 23, 2009 || Kitt Peak || Spacewatch || critical || align=right | 1.2 km || 
|-id=497 bgcolor=#E9E9E9
| 372497 ||  || — || September 16, 2009 || Catalina || CSS || — || align=right | 1.5 km || 
|-id=498 bgcolor=#E9E9E9
| 372498 ||  || — || August 26, 2009 || Socorro || LINEAR || JUN || align=right | 2.0 km || 
|-id=499 bgcolor=#E9E9E9
| 372499 ||  || — || September 15, 2009 || Kitt Peak || Spacewatch || — || align=right | 1.7 km || 
|-id=500 bgcolor=#E9E9E9
| 372500 ||  || — || April 26, 2003 || Kitt Peak || Spacewatch || — || align=right | 2.3 km || 
|}

372501–372600 

|-bgcolor=#E9E9E9
| 372501 ||  || — || September 24, 2009 || Kitt Peak || Spacewatch || — || align=right | 1.2 km || 
|-id=502 bgcolor=#E9E9E9
| 372502 ||  || — || September 25, 2009 || Kitt Peak || Spacewatch || — || align=right | 2.3 km || 
|-id=503 bgcolor=#E9E9E9
| 372503 ||  || — || September 25, 2009 || Kitt Peak || Spacewatch || — || align=right | 2.2 km || 
|-id=504 bgcolor=#E9E9E9
| 372504 ||  || — || September 17, 2009 || Kitt Peak || Spacewatch || — || align=right | 1.3 km || 
|-id=505 bgcolor=#E9E9E9
| 372505 ||  || — || September 25, 2009 || Kitt Peak || Spacewatch || — || align=right | 1.8 km || 
|-id=506 bgcolor=#E9E9E9
| 372506 ||  || — || September 25, 2009 || Kitt Peak || Spacewatch || BRG || align=right | 1.4 km || 
|-id=507 bgcolor=#E9E9E9
| 372507 ||  || — || September 25, 2009 || Kitt Peak || Spacewatch || — || align=right | 2.3 km || 
|-id=508 bgcolor=#E9E9E9
| 372508 ||  || — || September 25, 2009 || Kitt Peak || Spacewatch || — || align=right | 2.3 km || 
|-id=509 bgcolor=#E9E9E9
| 372509 ||  || — || September 25, 2009 || Kitt Peak || Spacewatch || — || align=right | 1.7 km || 
|-id=510 bgcolor=#E9E9E9
| 372510 ||  || — || September 25, 2009 || Kitt Peak || Spacewatch || WIT || align=right data-sort-value="0.94" | 940 m || 
|-id=511 bgcolor=#E9E9E9
| 372511 ||  || — || September 25, 2009 || Kitt Peak || Spacewatch || — || align=right | 2.0 km || 
|-id=512 bgcolor=#E9E9E9
| 372512 ||  || — || September 25, 2009 || Kitt Peak || Spacewatch || — || align=right | 1.3 km || 
|-id=513 bgcolor=#E9E9E9
| 372513 ||  || — || September 25, 2009 || Kitt Peak || Spacewatch || WIT || align=right | 1.1 km || 
|-id=514 bgcolor=#E9E9E9
| 372514 ||  || — || September 25, 2009 || Kitt Peak || Spacewatch || — || align=right | 1.4 km || 
|-id=515 bgcolor=#E9E9E9
| 372515 ||  || — || September 28, 2009 || Catalina || CSS || — || align=right | 2.1 km || 
|-id=516 bgcolor=#E9E9E9
| 372516 ||  || — || September 28, 2009 || Catalina || CSS || — || align=right | 2.2 km || 
|-id=517 bgcolor=#E9E9E9
| 372517 ||  || — || September 18, 2009 || Catalina || CSS || — || align=right | 1.1 km || 
|-id=518 bgcolor=#E9E9E9
| 372518 ||  || — || September 19, 2009 || Kitt Peak || Spacewatch || — || align=right | 1.7 km || 
|-id=519 bgcolor=#E9E9E9
| 372519 ||  || — || September 20, 2009 || Kitt Peak || Spacewatch || — || align=right data-sort-value="0.54" | 540 m || 
|-id=520 bgcolor=#E9E9E9
| 372520 ||  || — || September 20, 2009 || Mount Lemmon || Mount Lemmon Survey || — || align=right | 1.8 km || 
|-id=521 bgcolor=#E9E9E9
| 372521 ||  || — || September 28, 2009 || Catalina || CSS || JUN || align=right | 1.1 km || 
|-id=522 bgcolor=#E9E9E9
| 372522 ||  || — || September 16, 2009 || Kitt Peak || Spacewatch || — || align=right | 2.0 km || 
|-id=523 bgcolor=#E9E9E9
| 372523 ||  || — || September 16, 2009 || Mount Lemmon || Mount Lemmon Survey || RAF || align=right | 1.0 km || 
|-id=524 bgcolor=#E9E9E9
| 372524 ||  || — || September 17, 2009 || Kitt Peak || Spacewatch || — || align=right | 1.3 km || 
|-id=525 bgcolor=#E9E9E9
| 372525 ||  || — || September 17, 2009 || Kitt Peak || Spacewatch || — || align=right | 1.9 km || 
|-id=526 bgcolor=#E9E9E9
| 372526 ||  || — || September 18, 2009 || Kitt Peak || Spacewatch || HEN || align=right data-sort-value="0.81" | 810 m || 
|-id=527 bgcolor=#d6d6d6
| 372527 ||  || — || September 27, 2009 || Kitt Peak || Spacewatch || ARM || align=right | 5.9 km || 
|-id=528 bgcolor=#E9E9E9
| 372528 ||  || — || September 21, 2009 || Mount Lemmon || Mount Lemmon Survey || — || align=right | 1.9 km || 
|-id=529 bgcolor=#E9E9E9
| 372529 ||  || — || September 18, 2009 || Catalina || CSS || AER || align=right | 1.9 km || 
|-id=530 bgcolor=#E9E9E9
| 372530 ||  || — || September 21, 2009 || Mount Lemmon || Mount Lemmon Survey || — || align=right | 2.0 km || 
|-id=531 bgcolor=#E9E9E9
| 372531 ||  || — || September 27, 2009 || Socorro || LINEAR || — || align=right | 2.9 km || 
|-id=532 bgcolor=#E9E9E9
| 372532 ||  || — || September 19, 2009 || Mount Lemmon || Mount Lemmon Survey || — || align=right | 1.3 km || 
|-id=533 bgcolor=#E9E9E9
| 372533 ||  || — || October 10, 2009 || Pla D'Arguines || R. Ferrando || — || align=right | 3.1 km || 
|-id=534 bgcolor=#E9E9E9
| 372534 ||  || — || October 8, 2009 || La Sagra || OAM Obs. || — || align=right data-sort-value="0.88" | 880 m || 
|-id=535 bgcolor=#E9E9E9
| 372535 ||  || — || September 18, 2009 || Kitt Peak || Spacewatch || — || align=right | 1.3 km || 
|-id=536 bgcolor=#E9E9E9
| 372536 ||  || — || October 11, 2009 || Mount Lemmon || Mount Lemmon Survey || — || align=right | 1.6 km || 
|-id=537 bgcolor=#E9E9E9
| 372537 ||  || — || October 12, 2009 || La Sagra || OAM Obs. || — || align=right | 1.8 km || 
|-id=538 bgcolor=#E9E9E9
| 372538 ||  || — || October 13, 2009 || La Sagra || OAM Obs. || — || align=right | 1.8 km || 
|-id=539 bgcolor=#E9E9E9
| 372539 ||  || — || September 28, 2009 || Catalina || CSS || — || align=right | 1.4 km || 
|-id=540 bgcolor=#E9E9E9
| 372540 ||  || — || October 14, 2009 || Bisei SG Center || BATTeRS || — || align=right | 1.4 km || 
|-id=541 bgcolor=#fefefe
| 372541 ||  || — || October 14, 2009 || Catalina || CSS || NYS || align=right data-sort-value="0.74" | 740 m || 
|-id=542 bgcolor=#E9E9E9
| 372542 ||  || — || October 14, 2009 || Taunus || S. Karge, R. Kling || — || align=right | 1.3 km || 
|-id=543 bgcolor=#E9E9E9
| 372543 ||  || — || September 19, 2009 || Kitt Peak || Spacewatch || — || align=right | 1.2 km || 
|-id=544 bgcolor=#E9E9E9
| 372544 ||  || — || October 14, 2009 || La Sagra || OAM Obs. || — || align=right | 2.4 km || 
|-id=545 bgcolor=#E9E9E9
| 372545 ||  || — || September 6, 1999 || Kitt Peak || Spacewatch || — || align=right | 3.5 km || 
|-id=546 bgcolor=#E9E9E9
| 372546 ||  || — || October 14, 2009 || La Sagra || OAM Obs. || MAR || align=right | 1.3 km || 
|-id=547 bgcolor=#E9E9E9
| 372547 ||  || — || October 14, 2009 || La Sagra || OAM Obs. || — || align=right | 1.8 km || 
|-id=548 bgcolor=#E9E9E9
| 372548 ||  || — || September 25, 1992 || Kitt Peak || Spacewatch || — || align=right | 2.1 km || 
|-id=549 bgcolor=#E9E9E9
| 372549 ||  || — || October 10, 2009 || La Sagra || OAM Obs. || KON || align=right | 2.7 km || 
|-id=550 bgcolor=#E9E9E9
| 372550 ||  || — || October 14, 2009 || La Sagra || OAM Obs. || — || align=right data-sort-value="0.87" | 870 m || 
|-id=551 bgcolor=#E9E9E9
| 372551 ||  || — || October 14, 2009 || Purple Mountain || PMO NEO || ADE || align=right | 2.4 km || 
|-id=552 bgcolor=#E9E9E9
| 372552 ||  || — || October 14, 2009 || Catalina || CSS || — || align=right | 1.9 km || 
|-id=553 bgcolor=#E9E9E9
| 372553 ||  || — || October 15, 2009 || Catalina || CSS || — || align=right | 3.0 km || 
|-id=554 bgcolor=#E9E9E9
| 372554 ||  || — || October 17, 2009 || Hibiscus || N. Teamo || MAR || align=right | 1.4 km || 
|-id=555 bgcolor=#E9E9E9
| 372555 ||  || — || October 27, 2005 || Catalina || CSS || EUN || align=right | 1.2 km || 
|-id=556 bgcolor=#E9E9E9
| 372556 ||  || — || October 18, 2009 || Tiki || N. Teamo || — || align=right | 2.2 km || 
|-id=557 bgcolor=#E9E9E9
| 372557 ||  || — || October 17, 2009 || Bisei SG Center || BATTeRS || — || align=right | 2.4 km || 
|-id=558 bgcolor=#E9E9E9
| 372558 ||  || — || October 20, 2009 || Mayhill || A. Lowe || — || align=right | 2.4 km || 
|-id=559 bgcolor=#E9E9E9
| 372559 ||  || — || October 17, 2009 || Mount Lemmon || Mount Lemmon Survey || — || align=right | 1.5 km || 
|-id=560 bgcolor=#E9E9E9
| 372560 ||  || — || September 28, 2009 || Mount Lemmon || Mount Lemmon Survey || MRX || align=right data-sort-value="0.96" | 960 m || 
|-id=561 bgcolor=#E9E9E9
| 372561 ||  || — || October 20, 2009 || Bisei SG Center || BATTeRS || — || align=right | 2.0 km || 
|-id=562 bgcolor=#E9E9E9
| 372562 ||  || — || October 25, 2009 || Tzec Maun || L. Elenin || HNS || align=right | 1.5 km || 
|-id=563 bgcolor=#E9E9E9
| 372563 ||  || — || October 18, 2009 || Mount Lemmon || Mount Lemmon Survey || — || align=right | 2.0 km || 
|-id=564 bgcolor=#E9E9E9
| 372564 ||  || — || October 22, 2009 || Mount Lemmon || Mount Lemmon Survey || HEN || align=right | 1.4 km || 
|-id=565 bgcolor=#E9E9E9
| 372565 ||  || — || October 22, 2009 || Mount Lemmon || Mount Lemmon Survey || — || align=right | 3.7 km || 
|-id=566 bgcolor=#E9E9E9
| 372566 ||  || — || October 22, 2009 || Mount Lemmon || Mount Lemmon Survey || — || align=right | 1.7 km || 
|-id=567 bgcolor=#E9E9E9
| 372567 ||  || — || October 18, 2009 || Mount Lemmon || Mount Lemmon Survey || NEM || align=right | 2.3 km || 
|-id=568 bgcolor=#E9E9E9
| 372568 ||  || — || October 18, 2009 || Kitt Peak || Spacewatch || — || align=right | 1.9 km || 
|-id=569 bgcolor=#E9E9E9
| 372569 ||  || — || October 22, 2009 || Mount Lemmon || Mount Lemmon Survey || NEM || align=right | 2.6 km || 
|-id=570 bgcolor=#E9E9E9
| 372570 ||  || — || October 11, 2009 || Mount Lemmon || Mount Lemmon Survey || PAD || align=right | 1.7 km || 
|-id=571 bgcolor=#d6d6d6
| 372571 ||  || — || October 23, 2009 || Mount Lemmon || Mount Lemmon Survey || KOR || align=right | 1.4 km || 
|-id=572 bgcolor=#E9E9E9
| 372572 ||  || — || October 23, 2009 || Mount Lemmon || Mount Lemmon Survey || — || align=right | 1.2 km || 
|-id=573 bgcolor=#E9E9E9
| 372573 Pietromenga ||  ||  || October 24, 2009 || Magasa || M. Tonincelli, F. Zanardini || HNS || align=right | 1.7 km || 
|-id=574 bgcolor=#E9E9E9
| 372574 ||  || — || October 23, 2009 || Mount Lemmon || Mount Lemmon Survey || — || align=right | 1.9 km || 
|-id=575 bgcolor=#E9E9E9
| 372575 ||  || — || October 21, 2009 || Mount Lemmon || Mount Lemmon Survey || — || align=right | 1.7 km || 
|-id=576 bgcolor=#E9E9E9
| 372576 ||  || — || October 22, 2009 || Mount Lemmon || Mount Lemmon Survey || — || align=right | 1.8 km || 
|-id=577 bgcolor=#E9E9E9
| 372577 ||  || — || October 18, 2009 || Catalina || CSS || — || align=right | 1.1 km || 
|-id=578 bgcolor=#E9E9E9
| 372578 Khromov ||  ||  || October 24, 2009 || Zelenchukskaya || T. V. Kryachko || — || align=right | 2.9 km || 
|-id=579 bgcolor=#E9E9E9
| 372579 ||  || — || January 5, 2002 || Kitt Peak || Spacewatch || — || align=right | 1.5 km || 
|-id=580 bgcolor=#E9E9E9
| 372580 ||  || — || December 27, 2005 || Kitt Peak || Spacewatch || — || align=right | 1.1 km || 
|-id=581 bgcolor=#E9E9E9
| 372581 ||  || — || September 17, 2004 || Kitt Peak || Spacewatch || — || align=right | 2.1 km || 
|-id=582 bgcolor=#E9E9E9
| 372582 ||  || — || March 29, 2007 || Kitt Peak || Spacewatch || — || align=right | 2.1 km || 
|-id=583 bgcolor=#E9E9E9
| 372583 ||  || — || October 23, 2009 || Mount Lemmon || Mount Lemmon Survey || — || align=right | 1.5 km || 
|-id=584 bgcolor=#d6d6d6
| 372584 ||  || — || October 23, 2009 || Mount Lemmon || Mount Lemmon Survey || — || align=right | 3.2 km || 
|-id=585 bgcolor=#d6d6d6
| 372585 ||  || — || October 23, 2009 || Mount Lemmon || Mount Lemmon Survey || — || align=right | 3.5 km || 
|-id=586 bgcolor=#E9E9E9
| 372586 ||  || — || October 25, 2009 || Mount Lemmon || Mount Lemmon Survey || — || align=right | 2.1 km || 
|-id=587 bgcolor=#E9E9E9
| 372587 ||  || — || October 23, 2009 || Mount Lemmon || Mount Lemmon Survey || — || align=right | 2.0 km || 
|-id=588 bgcolor=#E9E9E9
| 372588 ||  || — || October 24, 2009 || Kitt Peak || Spacewatch || NEM || align=right | 2.0 km || 
|-id=589 bgcolor=#E9E9E9
| 372589 ||  || — || October 25, 2009 || Kitt Peak || Spacewatch || NEM || align=right | 2.0 km || 
|-id=590 bgcolor=#E9E9E9
| 372590 ||  || — || March 16, 2002 || Kitt Peak || Spacewatch || — || align=right | 1.9 km || 
|-id=591 bgcolor=#E9E9E9
| 372591 ||  || — || October 27, 2009 || Catalina || CSS || — || align=right | 1.3 km || 
|-id=592 bgcolor=#E9E9E9
| 372592 ||  || — || October 26, 2009 || Kitt Peak || Spacewatch || — || align=right | 2.0 km || 
|-id=593 bgcolor=#E9E9E9
| 372593 ||  || — || October 16, 2009 || Catalina || CSS || — || align=right data-sort-value="0.97" | 970 m || 
|-id=594 bgcolor=#E9E9E9
| 372594 ||  || — || October 27, 2009 || Mount Lemmon || Mount Lemmon Survey || EUN || align=right | 1.6 km || 
|-id=595 bgcolor=#E9E9E9
| 372595 ||  || — || October 27, 2009 || La Sagra || OAM Obs. || ADE || align=right | 3.1 km || 
|-id=596 bgcolor=#E9E9E9
| 372596 ||  || — || October 23, 2009 || Mount Lemmon || Mount Lemmon Survey || NEM || align=right | 2.3 km || 
|-id=597 bgcolor=#E9E9E9
| 372597 ||  || — || October 18, 2009 || La Sagra || OAM Obs. || — || align=right | 2.6 km || 
|-id=598 bgcolor=#E9E9E9
| 372598 ||  || — || October 18, 2009 || Mount Lemmon || Mount Lemmon Survey || HOF || align=right | 2.5 km || 
|-id=599 bgcolor=#E9E9E9
| 372599 ||  || — || October 26, 2009 || Mount Lemmon || Mount Lemmon Survey || WIT || align=right | 1.0 km || 
|-id=600 bgcolor=#d6d6d6
| 372600 ||  || — || October 18, 2009 || Mount Lemmon || Mount Lemmon Survey || KOR || align=right | 1.4 km || 
|}

372601–372700 

|-bgcolor=#E9E9E9
| 372601 ||  || — || November 9, 2009 || Mayhill || iTelescope Obs. || MAR || align=right | 1.5 km || 
|-id=602 bgcolor=#E9E9E9
| 372602 ||  || — || October 29, 2009 || Catalina || CSS || JUN || align=right | 1.1 km || 
|-id=603 bgcolor=#E9E9E9
| 372603 ||  || — || November 10, 2009 || Mayhill || iTelescope Obs. || — || align=right | 3.4 km || 
|-id=604 bgcolor=#E9E9E9
| 372604 ||  || — || November 8, 2009 || Kitt Peak || Spacewatch || — || align=right | 2.5 km || 
|-id=605 bgcolor=#E9E9E9
| 372605 ||  || — || November 8, 2009 || Kitt Peak || Spacewatch || WIT || align=right | 1.3 km || 
|-id=606 bgcolor=#E9E9E9
| 372606 ||  || — || November 8, 2009 || Catalina || CSS || PAD || align=right | 2.9 km || 
|-id=607 bgcolor=#E9E9E9
| 372607 ||  || — || November 8, 2009 || Mount Lemmon || Mount Lemmon Survey || AGN || align=right | 1.2 km || 
|-id=608 bgcolor=#E9E9E9
| 372608 ||  || — || November 8, 2009 || Mount Lemmon || Mount Lemmon Survey || AGN || align=right | 1.7 km || 
|-id=609 bgcolor=#E9E9E9
| 372609 ||  || — || November 8, 2009 || Mount Lemmon || Mount Lemmon Survey || — || align=right | 1.4 km || 
|-id=610 bgcolor=#E9E9E9
| 372610 ||  || — || October 24, 2009 || Kitt Peak || Spacewatch || NEM || align=right | 2.5 km || 
|-id=611 bgcolor=#E9E9E9
| 372611 ||  || — || November 9, 2009 || Kitt Peak || Spacewatch || — || align=right | 1.6 km || 
|-id=612 bgcolor=#E9E9E9
| 372612 ||  || — || November 9, 2009 || Kitt Peak || Spacewatch || AGN || align=right | 1.2 km || 
|-id=613 bgcolor=#E9E9E9
| 372613 ||  || — || November 9, 2009 || Mount Lemmon || Mount Lemmon Survey || — || align=right | 1.7 km || 
|-id=614 bgcolor=#E9E9E9
| 372614 ||  || — || November 9, 2009 || Kitt Peak || Spacewatch || — || align=right data-sort-value="0.92" | 920 m || 
|-id=615 bgcolor=#E9E9E9
| 372615 ||  || — || November 10, 2009 || Mount Lemmon || Mount Lemmon Survey || AGN || align=right | 1.3 km || 
|-id=616 bgcolor=#E9E9E9
| 372616 ||  || — || September 19, 2009 || Mount Lemmon || Mount Lemmon Survey || — || align=right | 1.4 km || 
|-id=617 bgcolor=#E9E9E9
| 372617 ||  || — || November 8, 2009 || Mount Lemmon || Mount Lemmon Survey || — || align=right | 1.6 km || 
|-id=618 bgcolor=#E9E9E9
| 372618 ||  || — || November 8, 2009 || Mount Lemmon || Mount Lemmon Survey || — || align=right | 2.1 km || 
|-id=619 bgcolor=#E9E9E9
| 372619 ||  || — || November 10, 2009 || Mount Lemmon || Mount Lemmon Survey || — || align=right | 2.5 km || 
|-id=620 bgcolor=#E9E9E9
| 372620 ||  || — || November 8, 2009 || Catalina || CSS || — || align=right | 2.8 km || 
|-id=621 bgcolor=#E9E9E9
| 372621 ||  || — || April 15, 2007 || Mount Lemmon || Mount Lemmon Survey || — || align=right | 1.9 km || 
|-id=622 bgcolor=#E9E9E9
| 372622 ||  || — || November 9, 2009 || Kitt Peak || Spacewatch || AER || align=right | 1.7 km || 
|-id=623 bgcolor=#E9E9E9
| 372623 ||  || — || January 9, 2006 || Kitt Peak || Spacewatch || AGN || align=right data-sort-value="0.94" | 940 m || 
|-id=624 bgcolor=#E9E9E9
| 372624 ||  || — || February 2, 2006 || Catalina || CSS || MRX || align=right | 1.4 km || 
|-id=625 bgcolor=#E9E9E9
| 372625 ||  || — || November 12, 2009 || La Sagra || OAM Obs. || — || align=right | 2.0 km || 
|-id=626 bgcolor=#E9E9E9
| 372626 IGEM ||  ||  || November 12, 2009 || Zelenchukskaya || T. V. Kryachko || — || align=right | 1.1 km || 
|-id=627 bgcolor=#E9E9E9
| 372627 ||  || — || November 8, 2009 || Catalina || CSS || ADE || align=right | 2.5 km || 
|-id=628 bgcolor=#E9E9E9
| 372628 ||  || — || November 9, 2009 || Catalina || CSS || CLO || align=right | 2.1 km || 
|-id=629 bgcolor=#E9E9E9
| 372629 ||  || — || November 8, 2009 || Mount Lemmon || Mount Lemmon Survey || — || align=right | 1.5 km || 
|-id=630 bgcolor=#E9E9E9
| 372630 ||  || — || September 24, 2000 || Kitt Peak || Spacewatch || MIS || align=right | 2.4 km || 
|-id=631 bgcolor=#E9E9E9
| 372631 ||  || — || November 9, 2009 || Mount Lemmon || Mount Lemmon Survey || — || align=right | 2.3 km || 
|-id=632 bgcolor=#E9E9E9
| 372632 ||  || — || October 18, 2009 || Catalina || CSS || AER || align=right | 1.7 km || 
|-id=633 bgcolor=#E9E9E9
| 372633 ||  || — || November 10, 2009 || Catalina || CSS || — || align=right | 1.4 km || 
|-id=634 bgcolor=#E9E9E9
| 372634 ||  || — || November 10, 2009 || Catalina || CSS || — || align=right | 1.9 km || 
|-id=635 bgcolor=#E9E9E9
| 372635 ||  || — || March 13, 2007 || Mount Lemmon || Mount Lemmon Survey || WIT || align=right | 1.1 km || 
|-id=636 bgcolor=#E9E9E9
| 372636 ||  || — || November 11, 2009 || Kitt Peak || Spacewatch || WIT || align=right | 1.0 km || 
|-id=637 bgcolor=#E9E9E9
| 372637 ||  || — || November 9, 2009 || Kitt Peak || Spacewatch || — || align=right | 2.5 km || 
|-id=638 bgcolor=#E9E9E9
| 372638 ||  || — || September 14, 2004 || Anderson Mesa || LONEOS || — || align=right | 2.7 km || 
|-id=639 bgcolor=#E9E9E9
| 372639 ||  || — || November 8, 2009 || Catalina || CSS || — || align=right | 2.6 km || 
|-id=640 bgcolor=#E9E9E9
| 372640 ||  || — || November 8, 2009 || Catalina || CSS || — || align=right | 2.6 km || 
|-id=641 bgcolor=#E9E9E9
| 372641 ||  || — || November 19, 2009 || Socorro || LINEAR || — || align=right | 1.5 km || 
|-id=642 bgcolor=#d6d6d6
| 372642 ||  || — || November 17, 2009 || Mount Lemmon || Mount Lemmon Survey || KOR || align=right | 1.3 km || 
|-id=643 bgcolor=#E9E9E9
| 372643 ||  || — || November 17, 2009 || Catalina || CSS || HOF || align=right | 3.1 km || 
|-id=644 bgcolor=#E9E9E9
| 372644 ||  || — || November 17, 2009 || Socorro || LINEAR || — || align=right | 3.7 km || 
|-id=645 bgcolor=#E9E9E9
| 372645 ||  || — || November 18, 2009 || Socorro || LINEAR || — || align=right | 3.5 km || 
|-id=646 bgcolor=#d6d6d6
| 372646 ||  || — || November 22, 2009 || Sandlot || G. Hug || — || align=right | 3.7 km || 
|-id=647 bgcolor=#d6d6d6
| 372647 ||  || — || November 16, 2009 || Kitt Peak || Spacewatch || KOR || align=right | 1.7 km || 
|-id=648 bgcolor=#E9E9E9
| 372648 ||  || — || November 16, 2009 || Kitt Peak || Spacewatch || PAD || align=right | 2.9 km || 
|-id=649 bgcolor=#E9E9E9
| 372649 ||  || — || November 30, 2005 || Kitt Peak || Spacewatch || — || align=right | 1.9 km || 
|-id=650 bgcolor=#d6d6d6
| 372650 ||  || — || November 16, 2009 || Kitt Peak || Spacewatch || — || align=right | 2.4 km || 
|-id=651 bgcolor=#E9E9E9
| 372651 ||  || — || November 17, 2009 || Kitt Peak || Spacewatch || NEM || align=right | 2.6 km || 
|-id=652 bgcolor=#E9E9E9
| 372652 ||  || — || November 8, 2009 || Mount Lemmon || Mount Lemmon Survey || — || align=right | 3.1 km || 
|-id=653 bgcolor=#d6d6d6
| 372653 ||  || — || November 17, 2009 || Kitt Peak || Spacewatch || — || align=right | 2.3 km || 
|-id=654 bgcolor=#E9E9E9
| 372654 ||  || — || November 18, 2009 || Kitt Peak || Spacewatch || MRX || align=right | 1.4 km || 
|-id=655 bgcolor=#d6d6d6
| 372655 ||  || — || November 22, 2009 || Mount Lemmon || Mount Lemmon Survey || EUP || align=right | 4.6 km || 
|-id=656 bgcolor=#E9E9E9
| 372656 ||  || — || November 16, 2009 || Auberry || Sierra Remote Obs. || — || align=right | 1.8 km || 
|-id=657 bgcolor=#d6d6d6
| 372657 ||  || — || November 16, 2009 || Socorro || LINEAR || TEL || align=right | 1.7 km || 
|-id=658 bgcolor=#E9E9E9
| 372658 ||  || — || November 16, 2009 || Kitt Peak || Spacewatch || — || align=right | 1.4 km || 
|-id=659 bgcolor=#d6d6d6
| 372659 ||  || — || October 25, 2009 || Kitt Peak || Spacewatch || — || align=right | 2.8 km || 
|-id=660 bgcolor=#E9E9E9
| 372660 ||  || — || November 18, 2009 || Kitt Peak || Spacewatch || — || align=right | 1.1 km || 
|-id=661 bgcolor=#d6d6d6
| 372661 ||  || — || November 18, 2009 || Kitt Peak || Spacewatch || — || align=right | 4.6 km || 
|-id=662 bgcolor=#E9E9E9
| 372662 ||  || — || November 18, 2009 || Kitt Peak || Spacewatch || — || align=right | 2.2 km || 
|-id=663 bgcolor=#E9E9E9
| 372663 ||  || — || November 18, 2009 || Kitt Peak || Spacewatch || AGN || align=right | 1.3 km || 
|-id=664 bgcolor=#d6d6d6
| 372664 ||  || — || November 18, 2009 || Kitt Peak || Spacewatch || EOS || align=right | 2.6 km || 
|-id=665 bgcolor=#E9E9E9
| 372665 ||  || — || November 11, 2009 || Kitt Peak || Spacewatch || WIT || align=right | 1.2 km || 
|-id=666 bgcolor=#E9E9E9
| 372666 ||  || — || September 18, 2009 || Mount Lemmon || Mount Lemmon Survey || — || align=right | 2.1 km || 
|-id=667 bgcolor=#E9E9E9
| 372667 ||  || — || November 19, 2009 || Kitt Peak || Spacewatch || — || align=right | 2.2 km || 
|-id=668 bgcolor=#E9E9E9
| 372668 ||  || — || December 7, 2005 || Kitt Peak || Spacewatch || — || align=right | 1.0 km || 
|-id=669 bgcolor=#E9E9E9
| 372669 ||  || — || January 23, 2006 || Kitt Peak || Spacewatch || — || align=right | 2.6 km || 
|-id=670 bgcolor=#E9E9E9
| 372670 ||  || — || November 21, 2009 || Kitt Peak || Spacewatch || — || align=right | 1.5 km || 
|-id=671 bgcolor=#d6d6d6
| 372671 ||  || — || November 17, 2009 || Mount Lemmon || Mount Lemmon Survey || — || align=right | 2.7 km || 
|-id=672 bgcolor=#d6d6d6
| 372672 ||  || — || October 12, 2009 || Mount Lemmon || Mount Lemmon Survey || CHA || align=right | 2.5 km || 
|-id=673 bgcolor=#E9E9E9
| 372673 ||  || — || October 27, 2009 || Kitt Peak || Spacewatch || HOF || align=right | 2.3 km || 
|-id=674 bgcolor=#d6d6d6
| 372674 ||  || — || November 20, 2009 || Kitt Peak || Spacewatch || — || align=right | 2.3 km || 
|-id=675 bgcolor=#d6d6d6
| 372675 ||  || — || November 20, 2009 || Kitt Peak || Spacewatch || KOR || align=right | 1.2 km || 
|-id=676 bgcolor=#d6d6d6
| 372676 ||  || — || November 20, 2009 || Kitt Peak || Spacewatch || — || align=right | 2.6 km || 
|-id=677 bgcolor=#E9E9E9
| 372677 ||  || — || November 20, 2009 || Kitt Peak || Spacewatch || — || align=right | 2.4 km || 
|-id=678 bgcolor=#E9E9E9
| 372678 ||  || — || September 7, 2004 || Kitt Peak || Spacewatch || HEN || align=right data-sort-value="0.91" | 910 m || 
|-id=679 bgcolor=#E9E9E9
| 372679 ||  || — || November 22, 2009 || Mount Lemmon || Mount Lemmon Survey || WIT || align=right data-sort-value="0.96" | 960 m || 
|-id=680 bgcolor=#E9E9E9
| 372680 ||  || — || September 15, 2009 || Kitt Peak || Spacewatch || HEN || align=right | 1.00 km || 
|-id=681 bgcolor=#E9E9E9
| 372681 ||  || — || November 19, 2009 || Mount Lemmon || Mount Lemmon Survey || AGN || align=right | 1.1 km || 
|-id=682 bgcolor=#E9E9E9
| 372682 ||  || — || November 19, 2009 || La Sagra || OAM Obs. || — || align=right | 2.8 km || 
|-id=683 bgcolor=#d6d6d6
| 372683 ||  || — || November 10, 2009 || Kitt Peak || Spacewatch || EUP || align=right | 5.2 km || 
|-id=684 bgcolor=#d6d6d6
| 372684 ||  || — || November 21, 2009 || Kitt Peak || Spacewatch || KOR || align=right | 1.3 km || 
|-id=685 bgcolor=#E9E9E9
| 372685 ||  || — || November 22, 2009 || Kitt Peak || Spacewatch || HOF || align=right | 2.7 km || 
|-id=686 bgcolor=#E9E9E9
| 372686 ||  || — || November 22, 2009 || Mount Lemmon || Mount Lemmon Survey || — || align=right | 1.6 km || 
|-id=687 bgcolor=#E9E9E9
| 372687 ||  || — || November 23, 2009 || Kitt Peak || Spacewatch || WIT || align=right | 1.1 km || 
|-id=688 bgcolor=#d6d6d6
| 372688 ||  || — || November 23, 2009 || Kitt Peak || Spacewatch || — || align=right | 3.1 km || 
|-id=689 bgcolor=#E9E9E9
| 372689 ||  || — || November 2, 2000 || Kitt Peak || Spacewatch || — || align=right | 2.2 km || 
|-id=690 bgcolor=#E9E9E9
| 372690 ||  || — || November 9, 2009 || Kitt Peak || Spacewatch || — || align=right | 2.0 km || 
|-id=691 bgcolor=#d6d6d6
| 372691 ||  || — || November 24, 2009 || Mount Lemmon || Mount Lemmon Survey || CHA || align=right | 1.9 km || 
|-id=692 bgcolor=#E9E9E9
| 372692 ||  || — || November 24, 2009 || La Sagra || OAM Obs. || — || align=right | 2.1 km || 
|-id=693 bgcolor=#d6d6d6
| 372693 ||  || — || November 25, 2009 || Mount Lemmon || Mount Lemmon Survey || — || align=right | 3.6 km || 
|-id=694 bgcolor=#E9E9E9
| 372694 ||  || — || April 18, 2007 || Mount Lemmon || Mount Lemmon Survey || AGN || align=right | 1.1 km || 
|-id=695 bgcolor=#d6d6d6
| 372695 ||  || — || November 17, 2009 || Kitt Peak || Spacewatch || KOR || align=right | 1.4 km || 
|-id=696 bgcolor=#E9E9E9
| 372696 ||  || — || November 17, 2009 || Kitt Peak || Spacewatch || HOF || align=right | 3.1 km || 
|-id=697 bgcolor=#E9E9E9
| 372697 ||  || — || November 18, 2009 || Kitt Peak || Spacewatch || — || align=right | 1.7 km || 
|-id=698 bgcolor=#d6d6d6
| 372698 ||  || — || November 16, 2009 || Kitt Peak || Spacewatch || EOS || align=right | 3.6 km || 
|-id=699 bgcolor=#E9E9E9
| 372699 ||  || — || September 22, 1995 || Kitt Peak || Spacewatch || — || align=right | 2.2 km || 
|-id=700 bgcolor=#E9E9E9
| 372700 ||  || — || October 7, 2004 || Kitt Peak || Spacewatch || — || align=right | 2.7 km || 
|}

372701–372800 

|-bgcolor=#E9E9E9
| 372701 ||  || — || November 17, 2009 || Mount Lemmon || Mount Lemmon Survey || — || align=right | 2.2 km || 
|-id=702 bgcolor=#E9E9E9
| 372702 ||  || — || November 17, 2009 || Kitt Peak || Spacewatch || PAD || align=right | 2.5 km || 
|-id=703 bgcolor=#E9E9E9
| 372703 ||  || — || September 20, 2009 || Mount Lemmon || Mount Lemmon Survey || MRX || align=right | 1.1 km || 
|-id=704 bgcolor=#E9E9E9
| 372704 ||  || — || November 25, 2009 || Kitt Peak || Spacewatch || — || align=right | 2.7 km || 
|-id=705 bgcolor=#d6d6d6
| 372705 ||  || — || November 19, 2009 || Kitt Peak || Spacewatch || KOR || align=right | 1.5 km || 
|-id=706 bgcolor=#d6d6d6
| 372706 ||  || — || November 24, 2009 || La Sagra || OAM Obs. || — || align=right | 4.2 km || 
|-id=707 bgcolor=#E9E9E9
| 372707 ||  || — || November 24, 2009 || Kitt Peak || Spacewatch || AST || align=right | 1.8 km || 
|-id=708 bgcolor=#d6d6d6
| 372708 ||  || — || October 21, 2008 || Mount Lemmon || Mount Lemmon Survey || — || align=right | 4.2 km || 
|-id=709 bgcolor=#E9E9E9
| 372709 ||  || — || November 17, 2009 || Kitt Peak || Spacewatch || — || align=right | 3.3 km || 
|-id=710 bgcolor=#d6d6d6
| 372710 ||  || — || November 21, 2009 || Mount Lemmon || Mount Lemmon Survey || — || align=right | 4.1 km || 
|-id=711 bgcolor=#d6d6d6
| 372711 ||  || — || November 20, 2009 || Kitt Peak || Spacewatch || KOR || align=right | 1.4 km || 
|-id=712 bgcolor=#d6d6d6
| 372712 ||  || — || December 11, 2009 || Mayhill || iTelescope Obs. || — || align=right | 5.4 km || 
|-id=713 bgcolor=#d6d6d6
| 372713 ||  || — || December 10, 2009 || Socorro || LINEAR || — || align=right | 3.8 km || 
|-id=714 bgcolor=#d6d6d6
| 372714 ||  || — || December 10, 2009 || Mount Lemmon || Mount Lemmon Survey || — || align=right | 5.7 km || 
|-id=715 bgcolor=#E9E9E9
| 372715 ||  || — || December 11, 2009 || Mount Lemmon || Mount Lemmon Survey || — || align=right | 2.8 km || 
|-id=716 bgcolor=#d6d6d6
| 372716 ||  || — || December 11, 2009 || Catalina || CSS || — || align=right | 2.9 km || 
|-id=717 bgcolor=#d6d6d6
| 372717 ||  || — || December 15, 2009 || Mount Lemmon || Mount Lemmon Survey || — || align=right | 3.6 km || 
|-id=718 bgcolor=#d6d6d6
| 372718 ||  || — || December 15, 2009 || Mount Lemmon || Mount Lemmon Survey || — || align=right | 3.0 km || 
|-id=719 bgcolor=#d6d6d6
| 372719 ||  || — || December 15, 2009 || Mount Lemmon || Mount Lemmon Survey || — || align=right | 2.7 km || 
|-id=720 bgcolor=#d6d6d6
| 372720 ||  || — || December 15, 2009 || Bergisch Gladbac || W. Bickel || LIX || align=right | 3.5 km || 
|-id=721 bgcolor=#E9E9E9
| 372721 ||  || — || September 3, 2004 || Siding Spring || SSS || — || align=right | 3.1 km || 
|-id=722 bgcolor=#d6d6d6
| 372722 ||  || — || December 10, 2009 || Mount Lemmon || Mount Lemmon Survey || EOS || align=right | 2.8 km || 
|-id=723 bgcolor=#d6d6d6
| 372723 ||  || — || December 15, 2009 || Mount Lemmon || Mount Lemmon Survey || — || align=right | 3.1 km || 
|-id=724 bgcolor=#d6d6d6
| 372724 ||  || — || December 17, 2009 || Mount Lemmon || Mount Lemmon Survey || EOS || align=right | 2.1 km || 
|-id=725 bgcolor=#d6d6d6
| 372725 ||  || — || December 17, 2009 || Mount Lemmon || Mount Lemmon Survey || — || align=right | 3.1 km || 
|-id=726 bgcolor=#d6d6d6
| 372726 ||  || — || December 17, 2009 || Mount Lemmon || Mount Lemmon Survey || — || align=right | 4.8 km || 
|-id=727 bgcolor=#E9E9E9
| 372727 ||  || — || November 25, 2009 || Mount Lemmon || Mount Lemmon Survey || — || align=right | 2.5 km || 
|-id=728 bgcolor=#d6d6d6
| 372728 ||  || — || December 17, 2009 || Mount Lemmon || Mount Lemmon Survey || EOS || align=right | 1.9 km || 
|-id=729 bgcolor=#E9E9E9
| 372729 ||  || — || December 18, 2009 || Mount Lemmon || Mount Lemmon Survey || — || align=right | 2.9 km || 
|-id=730 bgcolor=#d6d6d6
| 372730 ||  || — || December 10, 2009 || Mount Lemmon || Mount Lemmon Survey || — || align=right | 3.8 km || 
|-id=731 bgcolor=#d6d6d6
| 372731 ||  || — || December 25, 2009 || Kitt Peak || Spacewatch || — || align=right | 2.9 km || 
|-id=732 bgcolor=#d6d6d6
| 372732 ||  || — || December 26, 2009 || Kitt Peak || Spacewatch || — || align=right | 3.2 km || 
|-id=733 bgcolor=#d6d6d6
| 372733 ||  || — || December 27, 2009 || Kitt Peak || Spacewatch || — || align=right | 3.5 km || 
|-id=734 bgcolor=#d6d6d6
| 372734 ||  || — || December 27, 2009 || Kitt Peak || Spacewatch || — || align=right | 4.7 km || 
|-id=735 bgcolor=#d6d6d6
| 372735 ||  || — || September 5, 2008 || Kitt Peak || Spacewatch || — || align=right | 3.1 km || 
|-id=736 bgcolor=#d6d6d6
| 372736 ||  || — || January 6, 2010 || Kitt Peak || Spacewatch || — || align=right | 2.9 km || 
|-id=737 bgcolor=#d6d6d6
| 372737 ||  || — || January 6, 2010 || Kitt Peak || Spacewatch || — || align=right | 4.4 km || 
|-id=738 bgcolor=#d6d6d6
| 372738 ||  || — || January 8, 2010 || Kitt Peak || Spacewatch || — || align=right | 3.9 km || 
|-id=739 bgcolor=#d6d6d6
| 372739 ||  || — || January 8, 2010 || Kitt Peak || Spacewatch || — || align=right | 3.4 km || 
|-id=740 bgcolor=#d6d6d6
| 372740 ||  || — || January 8, 2010 || Kitt Peak || Spacewatch || — || align=right | 3.5 km || 
|-id=741 bgcolor=#d6d6d6
| 372741 ||  || — || January 8, 2010 || Kitt Peak || Spacewatch || ELF || align=right | 4.8 km || 
|-id=742 bgcolor=#d6d6d6
| 372742 ||  || — || January 8, 2010 || Kitt Peak || Spacewatch || EOS || align=right | 2.2 km || 
|-id=743 bgcolor=#d6d6d6
| 372743 ||  || — || October 10, 2008 || Mount Lemmon || Mount Lemmon Survey || — || align=right | 4.5 km || 
|-id=744 bgcolor=#d6d6d6
| 372744 ||  || — || January 15, 2010 || Mayhill || iTelescope Obs. || — || align=right | 4.0 km || 
|-id=745 bgcolor=#d6d6d6
| 372745 ||  || — || January 10, 2010 || Kitt Peak || Spacewatch || EOS || align=right | 2.5 km || 
|-id=746 bgcolor=#d6d6d6
| 372746 ||  || — || January 12, 2010 || Kitt Peak || Spacewatch || — || align=right | 4.2 km || 
|-id=747 bgcolor=#E9E9E9
| 372747 ||  || — || November 4, 1991 || Kitt Peak || Spacewatch || — || align=right | 1.3 km || 
|-id=748 bgcolor=#d6d6d6
| 372748 ||  || — || January 12, 2010 || Mount Lemmon || Mount Lemmon Survey || — || align=right | 2.8 km || 
|-id=749 bgcolor=#d6d6d6
| 372749 ||  || — || January 13, 2010 || Mount Lemmon || Mount Lemmon Survey || — || align=right | 4.1 km || 
|-id=750 bgcolor=#d6d6d6
| 372750 ||  || — || January 17, 2010 || Bisei SG Center || BATTeRS || — || align=right | 3.1 km || 
|-id=751 bgcolor=#E9E9E9
| 372751 ||  || — || January 19, 2010 || Črni Vrh || Črni Vrh || POS || align=right | 2.2 km || 
|-id=752 bgcolor=#E9E9E9
| 372752 ||  || — || May 5, 2000 || Kitt Peak || Spacewatch || — || align=right | 2.8 km || 
|-id=753 bgcolor=#d6d6d6
| 372753 ||  || — || February 5, 2010 || Catalina || CSS || — || align=right | 3.5 km || 
|-id=754 bgcolor=#d6d6d6
| 372754 ||  || — || February 5, 2010 || Kitt Peak || Spacewatch || VER || align=right | 3.2 km || 
|-id=755 bgcolor=#E9E9E9
| 372755 ||  || — || February 9, 2010 || WISE || WISE || — || align=right | 2.2 km || 
|-id=756 bgcolor=#E9E9E9
| 372756 ||  || — || September 20, 2009 || Catalina || CSS || ADE || align=right | 3.5 km || 
|-id=757 bgcolor=#d6d6d6
| 372757 ||  || — || February 9, 2010 || Mount Lemmon || Mount Lemmon Survey || THM || align=right | 2.5 km || 
|-id=758 bgcolor=#d6d6d6
| 372758 ||  || — || February 9, 2010 || Mount Lemmon || Mount Lemmon Survey || EOS || align=right | 2.9 km || 
|-id=759 bgcolor=#E9E9E9
| 372759 ||  || — || February 9, 2010 || Catalina || CSS || — || align=right | 1.5 km || 
|-id=760 bgcolor=#d6d6d6
| 372760 ||  || — || February 9, 2010 || Kitt Peak || Spacewatch || 7:4 || align=right | 4.9 km || 
|-id=761 bgcolor=#d6d6d6
| 372761 ||  || — || February 13, 2010 || Mount Lemmon || Mount Lemmon Survey || — || align=right | 5.1 km || 
|-id=762 bgcolor=#d6d6d6
| 372762 ||  || — || February 13, 2010 || Mount Lemmon || Mount Lemmon Survey || — || align=right | 3.9 km || 
|-id=763 bgcolor=#d6d6d6
| 372763 ||  || — || January 15, 2004 || Kitt Peak || Spacewatch || — || align=right | 3.1 km || 
|-id=764 bgcolor=#d6d6d6
| 372764 ||  || — || February 14, 2010 || Catalina || CSS || — || align=right | 3.6 km || 
|-id=765 bgcolor=#d6d6d6
| 372765 ||  || — || February 15, 2010 || Catalina || CSS || — || align=right | 4.3 km || 
|-id=766 bgcolor=#d6d6d6
| 372766 ||  || — || October 20, 2008 || Mount Lemmon || Mount Lemmon Survey || THM || align=right | 2.7 km || 
|-id=767 bgcolor=#d6d6d6
| 372767 ||  || — || February 15, 2010 || Socorro || LINEAR || — || align=right | 3.9 km || 
|-id=768 bgcolor=#d6d6d6
| 372768 ||  || — || December 19, 2003 || Kitt Peak || Spacewatch || — || align=right | 3.7 km || 
|-id=769 bgcolor=#d6d6d6
| 372769 ||  || — || February 15, 2010 || Kitt Peak || Spacewatch || — || align=right | 5.0 km || 
|-id=770 bgcolor=#d6d6d6
| 372770 ||  || — || February 9, 2010 || Catalina || CSS || — || align=right | 5.3 km || 
|-id=771 bgcolor=#d6d6d6
| 372771 ||  || — || February 13, 2010 || Catalina || CSS || — || align=right | 4.0 km || 
|-id=772 bgcolor=#d6d6d6
| 372772 ||  || — || February 10, 2010 || Kitt Peak || Spacewatch || — || align=right | 5.1 km || 
|-id=773 bgcolor=#d6d6d6
| 372773 ||  || — || February 16, 2010 || Kitt Peak || Spacewatch || HYG || align=right | 2.6 km || 
|-id=774 bgcolor=#E9E9E9
| 372774 ||  || — || February 18, 2010 || Siding Spring || SSS || BAR || align=right | 1.6 km || 
|-id=775 bgcolor=#d6d6d6
| 372775 ||  || — || October 10, 2008 || Mount Lemmon || Mount Lemmon Survey || HYG || align=right | 2.6 km || 
|-id=776 bgcolor=#d6d6d6
| 372776 ||  || — || February 17, 2010 || Kitt Peak || Spacewatch || LIX || align=right | 3.8 km || 
|-id=777 bgcolor=#d6d6d6
| 372777 ||  || — || February 17, 2010 || Kitt Peak || Spacewatch || — || align=right | 3.3 km || 
|-id=778 bgcolor=#E9E9E9
| 372778 ||  || — || January 10, 2006 || Kitt Peak || Spacewatch || PAD || align=right | 2.5 km || 
|-id=779 bgcolor=#d6d6d6
| 372779 ||  || — || March 17, 2005 || Kitt Peak || Spacewatch || — || align=right | 2.4 km || 
|-id=780 bgcolor=#d6d6d6
| 372780 ||  || — || March 16, 2010 || Dauban || F. Kugel || — || align=right | 4.7 km || 
|-id=781 bgcolor=#d6d6d6
| 372781 ||  || — || October 15, 2009 || Mount Lemmon || Mount Lemmon Survey || — || align=right | 5.5 km || 
|-id=782 bgcolor=#E9E9E9
| 372782 ||  || — || March 21, 2010 || WISE || WISE || HNA || align=right | 3.6 km || 
|-id=783 bgcolor=#d6d6d6
| 372783 ||  || — || April 7, 2010 || WISE || WISE || — || align=right | 5.1 km || 
|-id=784 bgcolor=#d6d6d6
| 372784 ||  || — || April 6, 2005 || Mount Lemmon || Mount Lemmon Survey || — || align=right | 3.7 km || 
|-id=785 bgcolor=#fefefe
| 372785 ||  || — || May 7, 2010 || Nogales || Tenagra II Obs. || H || align=right data-sort-value="0.70" | 700 m || 
|-id=786 bgcolor=#fefefe
| 372786 ||  || — || December 4, 2007 || Mount Lemmon || Mount Lemmon Survey || — || align=right | 1.4 km || 
|-id=787 bgcolor=#fefefe
| 372787 ||  || — || November 12, 2007 || Mount Lemmon || Mount Lemmon Survey || — || align=right | 1.1 km || 
|-id=788 bgcolor=#fefefe
| 372788 ||  || — || February 13, 2008 || Mount Lemmon || Mount Lemmon Survey || ERI || align=right | 1.8 km || 
|-id=789 bgcolor=#FA8072
| 372789 ||  || — || January 30, 2006 || Kitt Peak || Spacewatch || — || align=right data-sort-value="0.87" | 870 m || 
|-id=790 bgcolor=#fefefe
| 372790 ||  || — || November 11, 2007 || Mount Lemmon || Mount Lemmon Survey || FLO || align=right data-sort-value="0.72" | 720 m || 
|-id=791 bgcolor=#fefefe
| 372791 ||  || — || April 19, 2006 || Mount Lemmon || Mount Lemmon Survey || — || align=right data-sort-value="0.53" | 530 m || 
|-id=792 bgcolor=#fefefe
| 372792 ||  || — || February 1, 2005 || Kitt Peak || Spacewatch || FLO || align=right data-sort-value="0.62" | 620 m || 
|-id=793 bgcolor=#fefefe
| 372793 ||  || — || September 6, 2010 || Kitt Peak || Spacewatch || FLO || align=right data-sort-value="0.57" | 570 m || 
|-id=794 bgcolor=#fefefe
| 372794 ||  || — || April 19, 2006 || Mount Lemmon || Mount Lemmon Survey || — || align=right data-sort-value="0.61" | 610 m || 
|-id=795 bgcolor=#fefefe
| 372795 ||  || — || September 10, 2010 || Kitt Peak || Spacewatch || FLO || align=right data-sort-value="0.55" | 550 m || 
|-id=796 bgcolor=#fefefe
| 372796 ||  || — || September 11, 2010 || Kitt Peak || Spacewatch || — || align=right data-sort-value="0.54" | 540 m || 
|-id=797 bgcolor=#fefefe
| 372797 ||  || — || November 8, 2007 || Kitt Peak || Spacewatch || — || align=right data-sort-value="0.75" | 750 m || 
|-id=798 bgcolor=#fefefe
| 372798 ||  || — || September 15, 2010 || Kitt Peak || Spacewatch || — || align=right data-sort-value="0.71" | 710 m || 
|-id=799 bgcolor=#fefefe
| 372799 ||  || — || November 20, 2000 || Socorro || LINEAR || — || align=right data-sort-value="0.94" | 940 m || 
|-id=800 bgcolor=#fefefe
| 372800 ||  || — || September 17, 2010 || Kitt Peak || Spacewatch || — || align=right data-sort-value="0.61" | 610 m || 
|}

372801–372900 

|-bgcolor=#fefefe
| 372801 ||  || — || September 1, 2010 || Mount Lemmon || Mount Lemmon Survey || FLO || align=right data-sort-value="0.64" | 640 m || 
|-id=802 bgcolor=#fefefe
| 372802 ||  || — || May 11, 2002 || Socorro || LINEAR || V || align=right data-sort-value="0.83" | 830 m || 
|-id=803 bgcolor=#fefefe
| 372803 ||  || — || December 15, 2007 || Kitt Peak || Spacewatch || — || align=right data-sort-value="0.69" | 690 m || 
|-id=804 bgcolor=#fefefe
| 372804 ||  || — || April 2, 2005 || Kitt Peak || Spacewatch || — || align=right | 1.0 km || 
|-id=805 bgcolor=#fefefe
| 372805 ||  || — || September 15, 2007 || Mount Lemmon || Mount Lemmon Survey || — || align=right data-sort-value="0.62" | 620 m || 
|-id=806 bgcolor=#fefefe
| 372806 ||  || — || October 28, 1994 || Kitt Peak || Spacewatch || — || align=right data-sort-value="0.60" | 600 m || 
|-id=807 bgcolor=#fefefe
| 372807 ||  || — || April 1, 2009 || Mount Lemmon || Mount Lemmon Survey || — || align=right data-sort-value="0.67" | 670 m || 
|-id=808 bgcolor=#fefefe
| 372808 ||  || — || October 31, 2007 || Kitt Peak || Spacewatch || — || align=right data-sort-value="0.59" | 590 m || 
|-id=809 bgcolor=#fefefe
| 372809 ||  || — || October 3, 2010 || Kitt Peak || Spacewatch || FLO || align=right data-sort-value="0.63" | 630 m || 
|-id=810 bgcolor=#fefefe
| 372810 ||  || — || September 16, 2010 || Kitt Peak || Spacewatch || — || align=right data-sort-value="0.59" | 590 m || 
|-id=811 bgcolor=#fefefe
| 372811 ||  || — || October 30, 2000 || Kitt Peak || Spacewatch || FLO || align=right data-sort-value="0.49" | 490 m || 
|-id=812 bgcolor=#fefefe
| 372812 ||  || — || September 22, 2003 || Kitt Peak || Spacewatch || — || align=right data-sort-value="0.82" | 820 m || 
|-id=813 bgcolor=#fefefe
| 372813 ||  || — || October 9, 1994 || Kitt Peak || Spacewatch || — || align=right data-sort-value="0.86" | 860 m || 
|-id=814 bgcolor=#fefefe
| 372814 ||  || — || September 11, 2010 || Kitt Peak || Spacewatch || — || align=right data-sort-value="0.67" | 670 m || 
|-id=815 bgcolor=#fefefe
| 372815 ||  || — || September 16, 2010 || Mount Lemmon || Mount Lemmon Survey || — || align=right data-sort-value="0.79" | 790 m || 
|-id=816 bgcolor=#E9E9E9
| 372816 ||  || — || October 8, 2010 || Socorro || LINEAR || — || align=right | 2.0 km || 
|-id=817 bgcolor=#fefefe
| 372817 ||  || — || October 7, 2010 || Kitt Peak || Spacewatch || critical || align=right data-sort-value="0.52" | 520 m || 
|-id=818 bgcolor=#fefefe
| 372818 ||  || — || October 17, 2010 || Mount Lemmon || Mount Lemmon Survey || — || align=right data-sort-value="0.81" | 810 m || 
|-id=819 bgcolor=#fefefe
| 372819 ||  || — || March 9, 2005 || Mount Lemmon || Mount Lemmon Survey || FLO || align=right data-sort-value="0.52" | 520 m || 
|-id=820 bgcolor=#fefefe
| 372820 ||  || — || October 27, 2003 || Kitt Peak || Spacewatch || — || align=right data-sort-value="0.77" | 770 m || 
|-id=821 bgcolor=#fefefe
| 372821 ||  || — || November 27, 2000 || Kitt Peak || Spacewatch || — || align=right data-sort-value="0.72" | 720 m || 
|-id=822 bgcolor=#fefefe
| 372822 ||  || — || December 17, 2007 || Mount Lemmon || Mount Lemmon Survey || FLO || align=right data-sort-value="0.63" | 630 m || 
|-id=823 bgcolor=#fefefe
| 372823 ||  || — || December 19, 2007 || Mount Lemmon || Mount Lemmon Survey || — || align=right data-sort-value="0.70" | 700 m || 
|-id=824 bgcolor=#fefefe
| 372824 ||  || — || December 30, 2007 || Kitt Peak || Spacewatch || — || align=right data-sort-value="0.91" | 910 m || 
|-id=825 bgcolor=#fefefe
| 372825 ||  || — || October 30, 2010 || Kitt Peak || Spacewatch || — || align=right data-sort-value="0.99" | 990 m || 
|-id=826 bgcolor=#fefefe
| 372826 ||  || — || September 16, 2010 || Mount Lemmon || Mount Lemmon Survey || — || align=right data-sort-value="0.78" | 780 m || 
|-id=827 bgcolor=#fefefe
| 372827 ||  || — || October 29, 2010 || Kitt Peak || Spacewatch || — || align=right data-sort-value="0.82" | 820 m || 
|-id=828 bgcolor=#fefefe
| 372828 ||  || — || November 11, 2007 || Mount Lemmon || Mount Lemmon Survey || FLO || align=right data-sort-value="0.59" | 590 m || 
|-id=829 bgcolor=#fefefe
| 372829 ||  || — || February 7, 2008 || Kitt Peak || Spacewatch || — || align=right data-sort-value="0.90" | 900 m || 
|-id=830 bgcolor=#fefefe
| 372830 ||  || — || October 21, 2003 || Socorro || LINEAR || — || align=right data-sort-value="0.59" | 590 m || 
|-id=831 bgcolor=#fefefe
| 372831 ||  || — || May 29, 2009 || Siding Spring || SSS || V || align=right data-sort-value="0.70" | 700 m || 
|-id=832 bgcolor=#fefefe
| 372832 ||  || — || October 19, 2010 || Mount Lemmon || Mount Lemmon Survey || — || align=right data-sort-value="0.77" | 770 m || 
|-id=833 bgcolor=#fefefe
| 372833 ||  || — || October 20, 2003 || Socorro || LINEAR || FLO || align=right data-sort-value="0.72" | 720 m || 
|-id=834 bgcolor=#fefefe
| 372834 ||  || — || October 19, 2006 || Catalina || CSS || V || align=right data-sort-value="0.79" | 790 m || 
|-id=835 bgcolor=#fefefe
| 372835 ||  || — || December 19, 2007 || Mount Lemmon || Mount Lemmon Survey || V || align=right data-sort-value="0.55" | 550 m || 
|-id=836 bgcolor=#fefefe
| 372836 ||  || — || September 20, 2003 || Anderson Mesa || LONEOS || — || align=right data-sort-value="0.80" | 800 m || 
|-id=837 bgcolor=#fefefe
| 372837 ||  || — || November 1, 2010 || Kitt Peak || Spacewatch || — || align=right | 1.2 km || 
|-id=838 bgcolor=#fefefe
| 372838 ||  || — || December 19, 2004 || Mount Lemmon || Mount Lemmon Survey || — || align=right data-sort-value="0.72" | 720 m || 
|-id=839 bgcolor=#fefefe
| 372839 ||  || — || October 17, 2006 || Kitt Peak || Spacewatch || — || align=right data-sort-value="0.78" | 780 m || 
|-id=840 bgcolor=#fefefe
| 372840 ||  || — || August 24, 2000 || Socorro || LINEAR || — || align=right data-sort-value="0.88" | 880 m || 
|-id=841 bgcolor=#fefefe
| 372841 ||  || — || September 29, 2003 || Kitt Peak || Spacewatch || V || align=right data-sort-value="0.58" | 580 m || 
|-id=842 bgcolor=#fefefe
| 372842 ||  || — || November 16, 1995 || Kitt Peak || Spacewatch || NYS || align=right data-sort-value="0.63" | 630 m || 
|-id=843 bgcolor=#fefefe
| 372843 ||  || — || January 15, 2008 || Mount Lemmon || Mount Lemmon Survey || — || align=right data-sort-value="0.77" | 770 m || 
|-id=844 bgcolor=#fefefe
| 372844 ||  || — || September 15, 2006 || Kitt Peak || Spacewatch || MAS || align=right data-sort-value="0.90" | 900 m || 
|-id=845 bgcolor=#fefefe
| 372845 ||  || — || March 24, 2006 || Mount Lemmon || Mount Lemmon Survey || — || align=right data-sort-value="0.68" | 680 m || 
|-id=846 bgcolor=#fefefe
| 372846 ||  || — || September 24, 2000 || Socorro || LINEAR || — || align=right data-sort-value="0.66" | 660 m || 
|-id=847 bgcolor=#fefefe
| 372847 ||  || — || March 8, 2008 || Mount Lemmon || Mount Lemmon Survey || MAS || align=right data-sort-value="0.69" | 690 m || 
|-id=848 bgcolor=#fefefe
| 372848 ||  || — || January 12, 2008 || Kitt Peak || Spacewatch || — || align=right data-sort-value="0.68" | 680 m || 
|-id=849 bgcolor=#fefefe
| 372849 ||  || — || October 1, 2003 || Kitt Peak || Spacewatch || FLO || align=right data-sort-value="0.69" | 690 m || 
|-id=850 bgcolor=#fefefe
| 372850 ||  || — || September 24, 2000 || Socorro || LINEAR || FLO || align=right data-sort-value="0.55" | 550 m || 
|-id=851 bgcolor=#fefefe
| 372851 ||  || — || September 18, 2006 || Catalina || CSS || V || align=right data-sort-value="0.88" | 880 m || 
|-id=852 bgcolor=#fefefe
| 372852 ||  || — || November 13, 2007 || Mount Lemmon || Mount Lemmon Survey || — || align=right | 1.00 km || 
|-id=853 bgcolor=#fefefe
| 372853 ||  || — || August 16, 2006 || Siding Spring || SSS || — || align=right data-sort-value="0.97" | 970 m || 
|-id=854 bgcolor=#fefefe
| 372854 ||  || — || August 18, 2006 || Kitt Peak || Spacewatch || — || align=right data-sort-value="0.74" | 740 m || 
|-id=855 bgcolor=#fefefe
| 372855 ||  || — || May 28, 2009 || Siding Spring || SSS || — || align=right data-sort-value="0.93" | 930 m || 
|-id=856 bgcolor=#fefefe
| 372856 ||  || — || May 6, 2005 || Mount Lemmon || Mount Lemmon Survey || — || align=right data-sort-value="0.75" | 750 m || 
|-id=857 bgcolor=#fefefe
| 372857 ||  || — || December 4, 2007 || Mount Lemmon || Mount Lemmon Survey || — || align=right data-sort-value="0.69" | 690 m || 
|-id=858 bgcolor=#FA8072
| 372858 ||  || — || April 7, 2006 || Kitt Peak || Spacewatch || slow || align=right data-sort-value="0.80" | 800 m || 
|-id=859 bgcolor=#fefefe
| 372859 ||  || — || May 23, 2006 || Mount Lemmon || Mount Lemmon Survey || — || align=right data-sort-value="0.77" | 770 m || 
|-id=860 bgcolor=#fefefe
| 372860 ||  || — || January 18, 2008 || Mount Lemmon || Mount Lemmon Survey || FLO || align=right data-sort-value="0.54" | 540 m || 
|-id=861 bgcolor=#fefefe
| 372861 ||  || — || November 5, 2010 || Kitt Peak || Spacewatch || V || align=right data-sort-value="0.88" | 880 m || 
|-id=862 bgcolor=#fefefe
| 372862 ||  || — || December 14, 2003 || Kitt Peak || Spacewatch || — || align=right data-sort-value="0.86" | 860 m || 
|-id=863 bgcolor=#fefefe
| 372863 ||  || — || September 16, 2003 || Kitt Peak || Spacewatch || — || align=right data-sort-value="0.57" | 570 m || 
|-id=864 bgcolor=#fefefe
| 372864 ||  || — || October 1, 2003 || Kitt Peak || Spacewatch || — || align=right data-sort-value="0.95" | 950 m || 
|-id=865 bgcolor=#fefefe
| 372865 ||  || — || November 11, 2007 || Mount Lemmon || Mount Lemmon Survey || — || align=right data-sort-value="0.65" | 650 m || 
|-id=866 bgcolor=#fefefe
| 372866 ||  || — || August 27, 2006 || Kitt Peak || Spacewatch || FLO || align=right data-sort-value="0.68" | 680 m || 
|-id=867 bgcolor=#fefefe
| 372867 ||  || — || November 18, 2003 || Kitt Peak || Spacewatch || — || align=right | 1.1 km || 
|-id=868 bgcolor=#fefefe
| 372868 ||  || — || February 9, 2005 || Mount Lemmon || Mount Lemmon Survey || FLO || align=right data-sort-value="0.56" | 560 m || 
|-id=869 bgcolor=#fefefe
| 372869 ||  || — || October 2, 2006 || Mount Lemmon || Mount Lemmon Survey || NYS || align=right data-sort-value="0.54" | 540 m || 
|-id=870 bgcolor=#E9E9E9
| 372870 ||  || — || November 10, 2010 || Kitt Peak || Spacewatch || — || align=right | 1.8 km || 
|-id=871 bgcolor=#fefefe
| 372871 ||  || — || December 18, 2003 || Socorro || LINEAR || FLO || align=right data-sort-value="0.67" | 670 m || 
|-id=872 bgcolor=#fefefe
| 372872 ||  || — || November 1, 2000 || Socorro || LINEAR || FLO || align=right data-sort-value="0.74" | 740 m || 
|-id=873 bgcolor=#fefefe
| 372873 ||  || — || October 21, 2003 || Kitt Peak || Spacewatch || FLO || align=right data-sort-value="0.83" | 830 m || 
|-id=874 bgcolor=#fefefe
| 372874 ||  || — || November 19, 2003 || Kitt Peak || Spacewatch || — || align=right data-sort-value="0.73" | 730 m || 
|-id=875 bgcolor=#fefefe
| 372875 ||  || — || January 14, 2008 || Kitt Peak || Spacewatch || — || align=right data-sort-value="0.65" | 650 m || 
|-id=876 bgcolor=#FA8072
| 372876 ||  || — || July 25, 2003 || Socorro || LINEAR || — || align=right | 1.1 km || 
|-id=877 bgcolor=#fefefe
| 372877 ||  || — || January 15, 2008 || Mount Lemmon || Mount Lemmon Survey || — || align=right data-sort-value="0.69" | 690 m || 
|-id=878 bgcolor=#d6d6d6
| 372878 ||  || — || December 1, 2010 || Mount Lemmon || Mount Lemmon Survey || — || align=right | 3.0 km || 
|-id=879 bgcolor=#fefefe
| 372879 ||  || — || September 16, 2006 || Catalina || CSS || ERI || align=right | 1.8 km || 
|-id=880 bgcolor=#E9E9E9
| 372880 ||  || — || January 17, 2007 || Kitt Peak || Spacewatch || — || align=right | 1.6 km || 
|-id=881 bgcolor=#E9E9E9
| 372881 ||  || — || February 2, 2008 || Mount Lemmon || Mount Lemmon Survey || — || align=right | 1.4 km || 
|-id=882 bgcolor=#fefefe
| 372882 ||  || — || October 23, 2006 || Catalina || CSS || — || align=right | 1.6 km || 
|-id=883 bgcolor=#fefefe
| 372883 ||  || — || January 11, 2008 || Mount Lemmon || Mount Lemmon Survey || V || align=right data-sort-value="0.58" | 580 m || 
|-id=884 bgcolor=#fefefe
| 372884 ||  || — || October 9, 1999 || Kitt Peak || Spacewatch || FLO || align=right data-sort-value="0.59" | 590 m || 
|-id=885 bgcolor=#fefefe
| 372885 ||  || — || January 13, 2008 || Mount Lemmon || Mount Lemmon Survey || — || align=right data-sort-value="0.67" | 670 m || 
|-id=886 bgcolor=#fefefe
| 372886 ||  || — || September 17, 2003 || Kitt Peak || Spacewatch || — || align=right data-sort-value="0.60" | 600 m || 
|-id=887 bgcolor=#fefefe
| 372887 ||  || — || October 13, 2006 || Kitt Peak || Spacewatch || — || align=right data-sort-value="0.63" | 630 m || 
|-id=888 bgcolor=#fefefe
| 372888 ||  || — || February 28, 2000 || Socorro || LINEAR || V || align=right data-sort-value="0.99" | 990 m || 
|-id=889 bgcolor=#E9E9E9
| 372889 ||  || — || December 14, 2010 || Mount Lemmon || Mount Lemmon Survey || — || align=right | 2.3 km || 
|-id=890 bgcolor=#d6d6d6
| 372890 ||  || — || March 4, 2006 || Catalina || CSS || TIR || align=right | 4.2 km || 
|-id=891 bgcolor=#fefefe
| 372891 ||  || — || September 18, 2009 || Mount Lemmon || Mount Lemmon Survey || — || align=right | 1.1 km || 
|-id=892 bgcolor=#E9E9E9
| 372892 ||  || — || October 24, 2005 || Kitt Peak || Spacewatch || — || align=right | 1.5 km || 
|-id=893 bgcolor=#E9E9E9
| 372893 ||  || — || December 27, 2006 || Mount Lemmon || Mount Lemmon Survey || — || align=right | 1.9 km || 
|-id=894 bgcolor=#fefefe
| 372894 ||  || — || July 21, 2006 || Mount Lemmon || Mount Lemmon Survey || FLO || align=right data-sort-value="0.64" | 640 m || 
|-id=895 bgcolor=#E9E9E9
| 372895 ||  || — || January 10, 2007 || Kitt Peak || Spacewatch || — || align=right | 1.1 km || 
|-id=896 bgcolor=#E9E9E9
| 372896 ||  || — || March 9, 2003 || Kitt Peak || Spacewatch || WIT || align=right | 1.2 km || 
|-id=897 bgcolor=#E9E9E9
| 372897 ||  || — || March 13, 2003 || Kitt Peak || Spacewatch || — || align=right | 1.4 km || 
|-id=898 bgcolor=#E9E9E9
| 372898 ||  || — || November 4, 2005 || Kitt Peak || Spacewatch || — || align=right | 1.8 km || 
|-id=899 bgcolor=#fefefe
| 372899 ||  || — || September 15, 2009 || Mount Lemmon || Mount Lemmon Survey || — || align=right | 1.2 km || 
|-id=900 bgcolor=#E9E9E9
| 372900 ||  || — || November 11, 2005 || Kitt Peak || Spacewatch || — || align=right | 2.1 km || 
|}

372901–373000 

|-bgcolor=#d6d6d6
| 372901 ||  || — || January 10, 2011 || Kitt Peak || Spacewatch || — || align=right | 3.0 km || 
|-id=902 bgcolor=#E9E9E9
| 372902 ||  || — || October 26, 2005 || Kitt Peak || Spacewatch || — || align=right | 1.3 km || 
|-id=903 bgcolor=#d6d6d6
| 372903 ||  || — || February 11, 2010 || WISE || WISE || — || align=right | 3.2 km || 
|-id=904 bgcolor=#E9E9E9
| 372904 ||  || — || December 13, 2010 || Mount Lemmon || Mount Lemmon Survey || — || align=right | 2.1 km || 
|-id=905 bgcolor=#E9E9E9
| 372905 ||  || — || January 13, 2011 || Kitt Peak || Spacewatch || — || align=right | 2.5 km || 
|-id=906 bgcolor=#E9E9E9
| 372906 ||  || — || February 23, 2007 || Kitt Peak || Spacewatch || — || align=right | 1.7 km || 
|-id=907 bgcolor=#fefefe
| 372907 ||  || — || January 14, 2011 || Kitt Peak || Spacewatch || — || align=right data-sort-value="0.98" | 980 m || 
|-id=908 bgcolor=#E9E9E9
| 372908 ||  || — || January 27, 2007 || Mount Lemmon || Mount Lemmon Survey || — || align=right data-sort-value="0.83" | 830 m || 
|-id=909 bgcolor=#E9E9E9
| 372909 ||  || — || April 22, 2007 || Catalina || CSS || — || align=right | 2.9 km || 
|-id=910 bgcolor=#E9E9E9
| 372910 ||  || — || January 10, 2007 || Kitt Peak || Spacewatch || — || align=right | 1.1 km || 
|-id=911 bgcolor=#fefefe
| 372911 ||  || — || December 12, 2006 || Kitt Peak || Spacewatch || V || align=right data-sort-value="0.99" | 990 m || 
|-id=912 bgcolor=#fefefe
| 372912 ||  || — || September 14, 1994 || Kitt Peak || Spacewatch || — || align=right | 1.1 km || 
|-id=913 bgcolor=#fefefe
| 372913 ||  || — || April 12, 2000 || Kitt Peak || Spacewatch || MAS || align=right data-sort-value="0.97" | 970 m || 
|-id=914 bgcolor=#E9E9E9
| 372914 ||  || — || December 14, 2010 || Mount Lemmon || Mount Lemmon Survey || — || align=right | 1.9 km || 
|-id=915 bgcolor=#d6d6d6
| 372915 ||  || — || December 5, 2010 || Mount Lemmon || Mount Lemmon Survey || — || align=right | 2.9 km || 
|-id=916 bgcolor=#fefefe
| 372916 ||  || — || November 25, 2006 || Kitt Peak || Spacewatch || — || align=right data-sort-value="0.68" | 680 m || 
|-id=917 bgcolor=#fefefe
| 372917 ||  || — || November 10, 2006 || Kitt Peak || Spacewatch || MAS || align=right data-sort-value="0.92" | 920 m || 
|-id=918 bgcolor=#E9E9E9
| 372918 ||  || — || January 27, 2007 || Mount Lemmon || Mount Lemmon Survey || — || align=right data-sort-value="0.68" | 680 m || 
|-id=919 bgcolor=#fefefe
| 372919 ||  || — || November 15, 2006 || Kitt Peak || Spacewatch || — || align=right data-sort-value="0.75" | 750 m || 
|-id=920 bgcolor=#fefefe
| 372920 ||  || — || December 22, 2006 || Kitt Peak || Spacewatch || MAS || align=right data-sort-value="0.85" | 850 m || 
|-id=921 bgcolor=#E9E9E9
| 372921 ||  || — || September 20, 2009 || Kitt Peak || Spacewatch || HOF || align=right | 2.4 km || 
|-id=922 bgcolor=#E9E9E9
| 372922 ||  || — || August 21, 2004 || Siding Spring || SSS || WIT || align=right | 1.1 km || 
|-id=923 bgcolor=#E9E9E9
| 372923 ||  || — || November 1, 2005 || Catalina || CSS || — || align=right | 1.8 km || 
|-id=924 bgcolor=#E9E9E9
| 372924 ||  || — || February 8, 2002 || Kitt Peak || Spacewatch || — || align=right | 2.5 km || 
|-id=925 bgcolor=#E9E9E9
| 372925 ||  || — || October 7, 2005 || Kitt Peak || Spacewatch || — || align=right | 1.4 km || 
|-id=926 bgcolor=#E9E9E9
| 372926 ||  || — || October 17, 2009 || Catalina || CSS || HOF || align=right | 2.5 km || 
|-id=927 bgcolor=#E9E9E9
| 372927 ||  || — || September 19, 2009 || Kitt Peak || Spacewatch || — || align=right | 2.6 km || 
|-id=928 bgcolor=#d6d6d6
| 372928 ||  || — || March 10, 2000 || Kitt Peak || Spacewatch || — || align=right | 3.1 km || 
|-id=929 bgcolor=#d6d6d6
| 372929 ||  || — || January 15, 2005 || Catalina || CSS || — || align=right | 4.7 km || 
|-id=930 bgcolor=#E9E9E9
| 372930 ||  || — || October 24, 2005 || Kitt Peak || Spacewatch || — || align=right | 1.3 km || 
|-id=931 bgcolor=#E9E9E9
| 372931 ||  || — || February 21, 2007 || Mount Lemmon || Mount Lemmon Survey || HEN || align=right data-sort-value="0.80" | 800 m || 
|-id=932 bgcolor=#E9E9E9
| 372932 ||  || — || February 23, 2007 || Kitt Peak || Spacewatch || — || align=right data-sort-value="0.79" | 790 m || 
|-id=933 bgcolor=#E9E9E9
| 372933 ||  || — || December 2, 2010 || Mount Lemmon || Mount Lemmon Survey || — || align=right | 3.2 km || 
|-id=934 bgcolor=#E9E9E9
| 372934 ||  || — || September 15, 2004 || Kitt Peak || Spacewatch || AGN || align=right | 1.3 km || 
|-id=935 bgcolor=#d6d6d6
| 372935 ||  || — || February 19, 2010 || WISE || WISE || LUT || align=right | 5.6 km || 
|-id=936 bgcolor=#E9E9E9
| 372936 ||  || — || December 25, 2005 || Kitt Peak || Spacewatch || AGN || align=right | 1.6 km || 
|-id=937 bgcolor=#fefefe
| 372937 ||  || — || November 16, 2006 || Mount Lemmon || Mount Lemmon Survey || — || align=right data-sort-value="0.83" | 830 m || 
|-id=938 bgcolor=#d6d6d6
| 372938 ||  || — || February 27, 2006 || Kitt Peak || Spacewatch || THM || align=right | 2.2 km || 
|-id=939 bgcolor=#E9E9E9
| 372939 ||  || — || April 7, 2008 || Mount Lemmon || Mount Lemmon Survey || — || align=right | 1.5 km || 
|-id=940 bgcolor=#d6d6d6
| 372940 ||  || — || September 5, 2008 || Kitt Peak || Spacewatch || EOS || align=right | 1.8 km || 
|-id=941 bgcolor=#E9E9E9
| 372941 ||  || — || February 25, 2007 || Mount Lemmon || Mount Lemmon Survey || — || align=right | 1.5 km || 
|-id=942 bgcolor=#E9E9E9
| 372942 ||  || — || October 1, 2000 || Socorro || LINEAR || — || align=right | 2.2 km || 
|-id=943 bgcolor=#d6d6d6
| 372943 ||  || — || September 6, 2008 || Kitt Peak || Spacewatch || — || align=right | 2.3 km || 
|-id=944 bgcolor=#d6d6d6
| 372944 ||  || — || September 18, 2003 || Kitt Peak || Spacewatch || — || align=right | 2.3 km || 
|-id=945 bgcolor=#fefefe
| 372945 ||  || — || November 15, 2006 || Catalina || CSS || ERI || align=right | 1.5 km || 
|-id=946 bgcolor=#E9E9E9
| 372946 ||  || — || October 29, 2005 || Catalina || CSS || — || align=right | 1.0 km || 
|-id=947 bgcolor=#E9E9E9
| 372947 ||  || — || September 22, 2009 || Mount Lemmon || Mount Lemmon Survey || — || align=right | 1.2 km || 
|-id=948 bgcolor=#E9E9E9
| 372948 ||  || — || March 13, 2007 || Kitt Peak || Spacewatch || — || align=right | 2.2 km || 
|-id=949 bgcolor=#E9E9E9
| 372949 ||  || — || February 26, 2007 || Mount Lemmon || Mount Lemmon Survey || — || align=right | 1.4 km || 
|-id=950 bgcolor=#E9E9E9
| 372950 ||  || — || November 22, 2006 || Mount Lemmon || Mount Lemmon Survey || — || align=right | 1.0 km || 
|-id=951 bgcolor=#E9E9E9
| 372951 ||  || — || October 25, 2005 || Mount Lemmon || Mount Lemmon Survey || MRX || align=right | 1.1 km || 
|-id=952 bgcolor=#E9E9E9
| 372952 ||  || — || November 22, 2005 || Kitt Peak || Spacewatch || — || align=right | 2.2 km || 
|-id=953 bgcolor=#E9E9E9
| 372953 ||  || — || October 16, 2009 || Mount Lemmon || Mount Lemmon Survey || — || align=right | 1.4 km || 
|-id=954 bgcolor=#E9E9E9
| 372954 ||  || — || January 22, 1998 || Kitt Peak || Spacewatch || — || align=right | 2.1 km || 
|-id=955 bgcolor=#E9E9E9
| 372955 ||  || — || December 28, 2005 || Kitt Peak || Spacewatch || — || align=right | 2.3 km || 
|-id=956 bgcolor=#E9E9E9
| 372956 ||  || — || February 7, 2002 || Kitt Peak || Spacewatch || HEN || align=right | 1.2 km || 
|-id=957 bgcolor=#d6d6d6
| 372957 ||  || — || January 14, 2011 || Kitt Peak || Spacewatch || — || align=right | 2.9 km || 
|-id=958 bgcolor=#E9E9E9
| 372958 ||  || — || November 29, 2005 || Kitt Peak || Spacewatch || WIT || align=right | 1.2 km || 
|-id=959 bgcolor=#E9E9E9
| 372959 ||  || — || December 26, 2006 || Kitt Peak || Spacewatch || MAR || align=right data-sort-value="0.91" | 910 m || 
|-id=960 bgcolor=#E9E9E9
| 372960 ||  || — || November 19, 1995 || Kitt Peak || Spacewatch || — || align=right | 1.9 km || 
|-id=961 bgcolor=#d6d6d6
| 372961 ||  || — || September 25, 2008 || Mount Lemmon || Mount Lemmon Survey || HYG || align=right | 2.7 km || 
|-id=962 bgcolor=#E9E9E9
| 372962 ||  || — || February 8, 2002 || Kitt Peak || Spacewatch || — || align=right | 2.2 km || 
|-id=963 bgcolor=#E9E9E9
| 372963 ||  || — || November 5, 2005 || Kitt Peak || Spacewatch || fast? || align=right | 1.1 km || 
|-id=964 bgcolor=#E9E9E9
| 372964 ||  || — || December 19, 2001 || Kitt Peak || Spacewatch || — || align=right | 1.5 km || 
|-id=965 bgcolor=#E9E9E9
| 372965 ||  || — || October 30, 2005 || Kitt Peak || Spacewatch || — || align=right | 1.6 km || 
|-id=966 bgcolor=#E9E9E9
| 372966 ||  || — || October 14, 2001 || Kitt Peak || Spacewatch || — || align=right | 1.1 km || 
|-id=967 bgcolor=#E9E9E9
| 372967 ||  || — || August 31, 2005 || Kitt Peak || Spacewatch || — || align=right data-sort-value="0.94" | 940 m || 
|-id=968 bgcolor=#E9E9E9
| 372968 ||  || — || January 11, 2002 || Kitt Peak || Spacewatch || — || align=right | 1.5 km || 
|-id=969 bgcolor=#d6d6d6
| 372969 ||  || — || September 7, 2008 || Mount Lemmon || Mount Lemmon Survey || — || align=right | 3.4 km || 
|-id=970 bgcolor=#E9E9E9
| 372970 ||  || — || December 27, 2005 || Kitt Peak || Spacewatch || WIT || align=right | 1.2 km || 
|-id=971 bgcolor=#E9E9E9
| 372971 ||  || — || August 28, 2005 || Kitt Peak || Spacewatch || — || align=right data-sort-value="0.82" | 820 m || 
|-id=972 bgcolor=#d6d6d6
| 372972 ||  || — || January 20, 2006 || Kitt Peak || Spacewatch || — || align=right | 2.6 km || 
|-id=973 bgcolor=#fefefe
| 372973 ||  || — || December 11, 2006 || Kitt Peak || Spacewatch || — || align=right data-sort-value="0.78" | 780 m || 
|-id=974 bgcolor=#E9E9E9
| 372974 ||  || — || October 25, 2009 || Kitt Peak || Spacewatch || AGN || align=right | 1.1 km || 
|-id=975 bgcolor=#E9E9E9
| 372975 ||  || — || August 22, 2004 || Siding Spring || SSS || — || align=right | 3.3 km || 
|-id=976 bgcolor=#fefefe
| 372976 ||  || — || December 8, 2010 || Mount Lemmon || Mount Lemmon Survey || NYS || align=right data-sort-value="0.80" | 800 m || 
|-id=977 bgcolor=#E9E9E9
| 372977 ||  || — || September 26, 2009 || Kitt Peak || Spacewatch || MRX || align=right | 1.2 km || 
|-id=978 bgcolor=#E9E9E9
| 372978 ||  || — || September 30, 2009 || Mount Lemmon || Mount Lemmon Survey || — || align=right | 2.4 km || 
|-id=979 bgcolor=#E9E9E9
| 372979 ||  || — || February 15, 1997 || Kitt Peak || Spacewatch || — || align=right | 3.0 km || 
|-id=980 bgcolor=#d6d6d6
| 372980 ||  || — || September 6, 2008 || Kitt Peak || Spacewatch || — || align=right | 3.2 km || 
|-id=981 bgcolor=#d6d6d6
| 372981 ||  || — || January 23, 2006 || Kitt Peak || Spacewatch || — || align=right | 2.1 km || 
|-id=982 bgcolor=#E9E9E9
| 372982 ||  || — || September 29, 1995 || Kitt Peak || Spacewatch || — || align=right | 1.9 km || 
|-id=983 bgcolor=#d6d6d6
| 372983 ||  || — || May 6, 2006 || Mount Lemmon || Mount Lemmon Survey || — || align=right | 2.4 km || 
|-id=984 bgcolor=#E9E9E9
| 372984 ||  || — || September 9, 2004 || Socorro || LINEAR || — || align=right | 2.7 km || 
|-id=985 bgcolor=#E9E9E9
| 372985 ||  || — || October 14, 2009 || Mount Lemmon || Mount Lemmon Survey || — || align=right | 2.3 km || 
|-id=986 bgcolor=#E9E9E9
| 372986 ||  || — || December 31, 2005 || Kitt Peak || Spacewatch || — || align=right | 2.1 km || 
|-id=987 bgcolor=#E9E9E9
| 372987 ||  || — || October 26, 2009 || Mount Lemmon || Mount Lemmon Survey || MRX || align=right | 1.2 km || 
|-id=988 bgcolor=#fefefe
| 372988 ||  || — || March 27, 2000 || Kitt Peak || Spacewatch || NYS || align=right data-sort-value="0.94" | 940 m || 
|-id=989 bgcolor=#E9E9E9
| 372989 ||  || — || March 9, 2003 || Anderson Mesa || LONEOS || HNS || align=right | 1.3 km || 
|-id=990 bgcolor=#E9E9E9
| 372990 ||  || — || October 10, 1996 || Kitt Peak || Spacewatch || — || align=right | 1.7 km || 
|-id=991 bgcolor=#E9E9E9
| 372991 ||  || — || December 31, 1997 || Kitt Peak || Spacewatch || EUN || align=right | 1.4 km || 
|-id=992 bgcolor=#E9E9E9
| 372992 ||  || — || March 14, 2007 || Mount Lemmon || Mount Lemmon Survey || — || align=right | 2.0 km || 
|-id=993 bgcolor=#fefefe
| 372993 ||  || — || March 15, 2004 || Kitt Peak || Spacewatch || — || align=right | 1.1 km || 
|-id=994 bgcolor=#d6d6d6
| 372994 ||  || — || October 1, 2003 || Kitt Peak || Spacewatch || — || align=right | 3.3 km || 
|-id=995 bgcolor=#E9E9E9
| 372995 ||  || — || September 18, 2009 || Kitt Peak || Spacewatch || — || align=right | 1.4 km || 
|-id=996 bgcolor=#E9E9E9
| 372996 ||  || — || August 25, 2004 || Kitt Peak || Spacewatch || — || align=right | 1.8 km || 
|-id=997 bgcolor=#E9E9E9
| 372997 ||  || — || January 26, 2006 || Mount Lemmon || Mount Lemmon Survey || — || align=right | 2.5 km || 
|-id=998 bgcolor=#E9E9E9
| 372998 ||  || — || November 19, 2009 || Mount Lemmon || Mount Lemmon Survey || — || align=right | 2.3 km || 
|-id=999 bgcolor=#d6d6d6
| 372999 ||  || — || March 3, 2006 || Kitt Peak || Spacewatch || — || align=right | 2.6 km || 
|-id=000 bgcolor=#d6d6d6
| 373000 ||  || — || January 27, 2006 || Mount Lemmon || Mount Lemmon Survey || — || align=right | 2.1 km || 
|}

References

External links 
 Discovery Circumstances: Numbered Minor Planets (370001)–(375000) (IAU Minor Planet Center)

0372